

12001–12100 

|-
| 12001 Gasbarini ||  || Ron Gasbarini (born 1960) is an amateur astronomer whose interest was inspired by the Apollo missions in the 1960s. He has served as president of the Royal Astronomical Society of Canada's Niagara Centre and won the service award of the society in 1995. || 
|-id=002
| 12002 Suess ||  || Franz Eduard Suess (1867–1941), Austrian geologist who coined the term tektite. He was the son of geologist Eduard Suess (1831–1914) || 
|-id=003
| 12003 Hideosugai ||  || Hideo Sugai (born 1930), a retired teacher, is a Japanese amateur astronomer. He has been observing variable stars since 1951, and his data have been reported to the Variable Star Observers League in Japan. || 
|-id=005
| 12005 Delgiudice ||  || Maria del Giudice (born 1964), friend and now wife of one of the discovery team's observers and measurers, Frank Shelly || 
|-id=006
| 12006 Hruschka || 1996 OO || František Hruschka (1819–1888) invented the centrifugal honey extractor and demonstrated it at an exposition in Brno (now in the Czech Republic) in 1865. He gained recognition for the development of modern beekeeping || 
|-id=007
| 12007 Fermat ||  || Pierre de Fermat, (1601–1665), a lawyer in Toulouse, is considered the greatest amateur mathematician of all time. || 
|-id=008
| 12008 Kandrup ||  || Henry Kandrup (1955–2003), an American astrophysicist and professor at the University of Florida, Gainesville. His eccentric and energetic lecturing style and love of nonlinear dynamics are now reflected in his celestial namesake, an unusual minor planet on a chaotic trajectory. The asteroid was named in his memory. || 
|-id=010
| 12010 Kovářov || 1996 UN || Kovářov, first mentioned in 1220, is a south Bohemian village situated in a pleasant hilly landscape near Milevsko. It is known for its rich community life, including living folk customs as well as for its Gothic church and Brokoff's baroque statues. Its Czech name originates from blacksmith work. || 
|-id=012
| 12012 Kitahiroshima ||  || Kitahiroshima, a city in Hokkaido in northeastern Japan. || 
|-id=013
| 12013 Sibatahosimi ||  || Sibatamachi-hosiwomirukai, a Japanese amateur astronomer club in Sibata town, Miyagi prefecture, founded in 1986 || 
|-id=014
| 12014 Bobhawkes ||  || Robert Lewis Hawkes (born 1951), Canadian physicist Src || 
|-id=016
| 12016 Green || 1996 XC || George Green (1793–1841), a self-taught miller's son of Nottingham, was instrumental (along with Gauss) in making the theories of electricity and magnetism a part of mathematical physics. || 
|-id=022
| 12022 Hilbert ||  || David Hilbert (1862–1943), professor at Göttingen and one of the greatest mathematicians of all time. || 
|-id=027
| 12027 Masaakitanaka ||  || Japanese amateur astronomer Masaaki Tanaka (born 1952) uses a Schmidt camera and binoculars to observe comets. He was one of the observers who rediscovered comet 122P/de Vico on 17 September 1995 || 
|-id=028
| 12028 Annekinney ||  || Astronomer Anne L. Kinney (born 1950) quantified the misalignment of the central black hole accretion disk and galaxy disk in Seyfert galaxies. She served as Director of NASA's Universe Division and Director of Goddard's Solar System Exploration Division. In 2015 she was named Chief Scientist for the Keck Observatory. || 
|-id=031
| 12031 Kobaton ||  || Kobaton is a Eurasian collared dove (Shirakobato in Japanese), and is the official mascot character of Saitama Prefecture since 2005. || 
|-id=032
| 12032 Ivory ||  || Sir James Ivory (1765–1842), Scottish mathematician. || 
|-id=033
| 12033 Anselmo ||  || Anselmo Antonini (born 1946), an amateur astronomer in the Montelupo Group. || 
|-id=035
| 12035 Ruggieri ||  || Guido Ruggieri (1913–1976), an Italian amateur astronomer known for his visual observations of Mars and Jupiter || 
|-id=040
| 12040 Jacobi ||  || Carl Gustav Jacob Jacobi, (1804–1851), professor at Königsberg and Berlin. || 
|-id=042
| 12042 Laques || 1997 FC || Pierre Laques (born 1934), a French astronomer and one of the co-discoverers of Helene (Saturn XII), a moon of Saturn, at the Pic du Midi Observatory || 
|-id=044
| 12044 Fabbri || 1997 FU || Luciano Fabbri (born 1945), an amateur astronomer in the Montelupo Group. || 
|-id=045
| 12045 Klein ||  || Felix Klein (1849–1925), a professor of mathematics at Erlangen and later at Göttingen. || 
|-id=047
| 12047 Hideomitani ||  || In 1975, Hideo Mitani (born 1946) founded a library of nature photographs, including astronomical photographs. It became the most famous library of its kind in Japan and cultivated many other nature photographers. || 
|-id=050
| 12050 Humecronyn ||  || Hume Blake Cronyn, Canadian businessman and politician † || 
|-id=051
| 12051 Pícha || 1997 JO || Jaroslav Pícha (1921–1998), Czech meteorologist and amateur astronomer || 
|-id=052
| 12052 Aretaon ||  || Aretaon, a Trojan warrior who was killed by Teucer. || 
|-id=053
| 12053 Turtlestar ||  || Turtle Star Observatory (obs. code 628) located in Mülheim-Ruhr, Germany. It was built in 1995, by Andreas Boeker, his wife Karolin, Axel Martin and M. Tator. † || 
|-id=056
| 12056 Yoshigeru ||  || Yoshida Shigeru (1952–1997), a Japanese physician. || 
|-id=057
| 12057 Alfredsturm ||  || Alfred Sturm co-founder with Martin Geffert of the Starkenburg Observatory (Starkenburg-Sternwarte) in Heppenheim, Germany † ‡ || 
|-id=059
| 12059 du Châtelet ||  || Emilie du Châtelet (1706–1749), an acknowledged scientist among the leading thinkers of her time, translated Newton's Principia Mathematica into French in 1749, this still being considered the best existing translation. In 1745 she showed that the energy of a moving object is proportional to its mass and the square of its velocity || 
|-id=061
| 12061 Alena ||  || Alena Ruth Robbins, the mother of the discoverer. || 
|-id=062
| 12062 Tilmanspohn ||  || Tilman Spohn (born 1950) was director of the Institute of Planetary Research at the German Aerospace Center (DLR) in Berlin. He pioneered in-situ measurements of thermal and mechanical properties of planetary surfaces and was Principal Investigator for the instrument MUPUS on the Rosetta lander Philae. || 
|-id=064
|-id=065
| 12065 Jaworski ||  || Victor Jaworski (born 1984), an ISEF awardee in 2002 || 
|-id=067
| 12067 Jeter ||  || Crystal Lynn Jeter (born 1984), an ISEF awardee in 2002 || 
|-id=068
| 12068 Khandrika ||  || Harish Gautam Khandrika (born 1987), an ISEF awardee in 2002 || 
|-id=070
| 12070 Kilkis ||  || Siir Sirinyasam Kilkis (born 1984), an ISEF awardee in 2002 || 
|-id=071
| 12071 Davykim ||  || Davy Kim (born 1985), an ISEF awardee in 2002 || 
|-id=072
| 12072 Anupamakotha ||  || Anupama Kotha (born 1985), an ISEF awardee in 2002 || 
|-id=073
| 12073 Larimer ||  || Curtis James Larimer (born 1986), an ISEF awardee in 2002 || 
|-id=074
| 12074 Carolinelau ||  || Caroline Sue-Yuk Lau (born 1984), an ISEF awardee in 2002 || 
|-id=075
| 12075 Legg ||  || Tiffany Amelia Legg (born 1987), an ISEF awardee in 2002 || 
|-id=079
| 12079 Kaibab ||  || The Kaibab Formation, a massive limestone layer of Permian age that forms the bedrock of much of Northern Arizona. || 
|-id=084
| 12084 Unno ||  || Juza Unno (a.k.a. Sano Shoichi), Japanese mystery writer and pioneer of science fiction || 
|-id=086
| 12086 Joshualevine ||  || Joshua Levine (born 1985), an ISEF awardee in 2002 || 
|-id=087
| 12087 Tiffanylin ||  || Tiffany Fangtse Lin (born 1984), an ISEF awardee in 2002 || 
|-id=088
| 12088 Macalintal ||  || Jeric Valles Macalintal (born 1986), an ISEF awardee in 2002 || 
|-id=089
| 12089 Maichin ||  || Diana Marie Maichin (born 1983), an ISEF awardee in 2002 || 
|-id=091
| 12091 Jesmalmquist ||  || Jessica Lea Malmquist (born 1987), an ISEF awardee in 2002 || 
|-id=093
| 12093 Chrimatthews ||  || Christina Marie Matthews (born 1986), an ISEF awardee in 2002 || 
|-id=094
| 12094 Mazumder ||  || Mark Mohan Mazumder (born 1985), an ISEF awardee in 2002 || 
|-id=095
| 12095 Pinel ||  || Philippe Pinel (1745–1826), a French physician who made revolutionary contributions to the treatment of patients suffering from mental illness, became chief physician at the La Salpêtrière clinic in Paris. His Traité médico-philosophique sur l´Aliénation mentale (1801) has been translated into several languages || 
|-id=099
| 12099 Meigooni ||  || David Nima Meigooni (born 1986), an ISEF awardee in 2002 || 
|-id=100
| 12100 Amiens ||  || The French city of Amiens, the capital of Picardy. It is famous for its cathedral, the tallest of the Gothic churches in France. Notable for its beautiful sculptures on the principal façade, it has been named the "Parthenon of Gothic architecture". The city is also worth a visit for its complex of gardens along the Somme river. || 
|}

12101–12200 

|-
| 12101 Trujillo ||  || Chad Trujillo (born 1973), an American astronomer and discoverer of minor planets of the California Institute of Technology, specializes in the study of Kuiper belt objects. || 
|-id=102
| 12102 Piazzolla ||  || Astor Piazzolla (1921–1992) was an Argentinean composer best known for his distinct nuevo tango. His fusion of the tango with Western musical elements, especially jazz, was successful in producing a new individual musical style. || 
|-id=104
| 12104 Chesley ||  || Steven R. Chesley (born 1965), of the Solar System Dynamics Group at the Jet Propulsion Laboratory, is an expert in determination of the orbits of minor planets and application to the study of earth-impact probability. || 
|-id=106
| 12106 Menghuan ||  || Meng Huan (born 1985), an ISEF awardee in 2002 || 
|-id=111
| 12111 Ulm || 1998 LU || Ulm, a city in Germany on the banks of the Danube river || 
|-id=112
| 12112 Sprague ||  || Ann Sprague (born 1946) is a senior research associate with the Lunar and Planetary Laboratory of the University of Arizona. She is known for her work on the atmospheres of Mercury, the moon and Mars, as well as on the Messenger mission to Mercury || 
|-id=113
| 12113 Hollows ||  || Fred Hollows (1929–1993), was a New Zealand-born ophthalmologist who saved the sight of thousands of aboriginal and poor people in third-world countries rather than make a comfortable living at home. His work outlives him, following his training of local doctors and establishing local interocular lens factories. || 
|-id=115
| 12115 Robertgrimm ||  || Robert Grimm (born 1960) is a planetary geophysicist. His thermal models led to the first mathematical representations of fluid flow on meteorite parent bodies and to a greater understanding of the thermal and collisional evolution of minor planets, including the heliocentric zonation of the main belt || 
|-id=117
| 12117 Meagmessina ||  || Meagan Elizabeth Messina (born 1985), an ISEF awardee in 2002 || 
|-id=118
| 12118 Mirotsin ||  || Yauhen Adolfovich Mirotsin (born 1985), an ISEF awardee in 2002 || 
|-id=119
| 12119 Memamis ||  || Megan Marie Miskowski (born 1984), an ISEF awardee in 2002 || 
|-id=123
| 12123 Pazin ||  || Pazin, a Croatian town in the Istrian Peninsula and the administrative center of Istria County. || 
|-id=124
| 12124 Hvar ||  || Hvar, a Croatian island in the Adriatic Sea, located off the Dalmatian coast. || 
|-id=125
| 12125 Jamesjones ||  || James Jones (born 1939) studied at Sheffield University in Yorkshire and has been professor of physics at the University of Western Ontario since 1966. Jones pioneered the video observation of meteors and single-station radar radiant mapping. || 
|-id=127
| 12127 Mamiya ||  || Rinzo Mamiya (1780–1844), an explorer and surveyor of the northern area of Japan. In 1809, he reached the north Sakhalin and showed that Karafuto (Sakhalin) is an island separated by a narrow channel, now called the Mamiya strait. || 
|-id=128
| 12128 Palermiti ||  || Mike Palermiti (born 1949) provides expert consultation to the astronomical community about optics, telescope design and CCDs. He contributed to the early development of low-light-level imaging and has made significant observations of novae, minor planets, comets and occultations. He is a director of an observatory in Florida. || 
|-id=130
| 12130 Mousa ||  || Ahmed Shaker Mousa (born 1984), 2002 Intel ISEF finalist. He attended the Avon Grove High School, Lincoln University, Pennsylvania, U.S.A. || 
|-id=131
| 12131 Echternach || 2085 P-L || Eddy Echternach (born 1961), a Dutch science writer and assistant editor of the Dutch astronomical magazine Zenit, has been popularizing astronomy since the late 1980s. He is co-author of numerous books on astronomy and astronomical exercises for use in primary and high schools. The name was suggested by C. E. Koppeschaar. || 
|-id=132
| 12132 Wimfröger || 2103 P-L || Willem Albertus Fröger (born 1962) is a Dutch amateur astronomer who lives in Argentina. He suggested names and prepared citations for more than 60 minor planets, one lunar crater and two craters on Mars. || 
|-id=133
| 12133 Titulaer || 2558 P-L || Chriet Titulaer (1943–2017), Dutch science writer and astronomer, co-presenter, with Henk Terlingen, of the Dutch television coverage of the Apollo Moon landings || 
|-id=134
| 12134 Hansfriedeman || 2574 P-L || Johannes Lambertus Maria ("Hans") Friedeman (1937–1996), was a Dutch journalist who enthusiastically reported on space travel, science and the environment. In 1977 he started his own weekly page, and in 1981 this led to the first complete section on science and society in a Dutch newspaper. || 
|-id=135
| 12135 Terlingen || 3021 P-L || Henk Terlingen (1941–1994), a Dutch journalist who presented the Apollo moon missions on Dutch television. Since the 1960s, his broadcasts in collaboration with Chriet Titulaer promoted a great interest in astronomy and space science in the Netherlands. The name was suggested by C. E. Koppeschaar. || 
|-id=136
| 12136 Martinryle || 3045 P-L || Martin Ryle (1918–1984) was a British astrophysicist who developed the aperture synthesis technique of interferometry and constructed large radio telescopes, using them to discover and catalogue numerous radio sources. || 
|-id=137
| 12137 Williefowler || 4004 P-L || William Alfred Fowler (1911–1995) was a nuclear astrophysicist who measured in the laboratory at Caltech the nuclear reactions that occur at lower energies in stars. He also worked on theories of supernovae and early nucleosynthesis. || 
|-id=138
| 12138 Olinwilson || 4053 P-L || Olin C. Wilson (1909–1994) was an American spectroscopist who worked on solar and stellar activity cycles. With M. K. V. Bappu he found a method of determining a star's luminosity from the widths of two spectral lines with (see Wilson-Bappu effect) || 
|-id=139
| 12139 Tomcowling || 4055 P-L || Thomas G. Cowling (1906–1990), British astrophysicist, was the first to compute a stellar model with a convective core and a radiative envelope. He also developed much of the theory of magnetic fields in stars and magnetospheres. || 
|-id=140
| 12140 Johnbolton || 4087 P-L || John G. Bolton (1922–1993) was a pioneer radio astronomer in Australia who used interferometry with direct and sea-reflected signals to identify the first radio sources with optical objects. He directed two major radio observatories. || 
|-id=141
| 12141 Chushayashi || 4112 P-L || Chushiro Hayashi (1920–2010) was a Japanese astrophysicist who made pioneering models of star formation and significant discoveries related to the formation of elements in the early universe. || 
|-id=142
| 12142 Franklow || 4624 P-L || Frank J. Low (1933–2009), American physicist and astronomer, invented the gallium-doped germanium bolometer and became a leader in infrared astronomy. He pioneered open-port airborne astronomy and helped develop infrared spaceborne astronomy. || 
|-id=143
| 12143 Harwit || 4631 P-L || Martin Harwit (born 1931), Czech-American astrophysicist and infrared astronomer, director (1987–1995) of the Smithsonian Institution's National Air and Space Museum || 
|-id=144
| 12144 Einhart || 4661 P-L || Einhart (also Eginhard or Einhard, ca. 770) was a Frankish scholar and historian. He was the chancellor of Charles the Great and of his son Ludwig the Pious. Einhard wrote Vita Karoli Magni, the biography of Charles the Great, one of the most precious books of the early Middle Ages || 
|-id=145
| 12145 Behaim || 4730 P-L || Martin Behaim (1459–1507) was a German merchant, astronomer and cosmographer from Nürnberg. He traveled through Europe and became a Portuguese knight. He developed the earliest terrestrial globe, Erdapfel, or `Earth Apple', with a diameter of about 50 cm || 
|-id=146
| 12146 Ostriker || 6035 P-L || Jeremiah P. Ostriker (born 1937) is an American astrophysicist who has contributed to many fields of theoretical astrophysics and cosmology, including the distribution of baryonic and dark matter and values of cosmological parameters. || 
|-id=147
| 12147 Bramante || 6082 P-L || Donato Bramante (1444–1514) was an Italian architect of the high Renaissance, working mainly in Milan and Rome. In Rome he designed his greatest work, St. Peter's Basilica || 
|-id=148
| 12148 Caravaggio || 6636 P-L || Caravaggio (1571–1610) was an Italian artist of the Renaissance. He was almost forgotten after his death, but in the twentieth century his importance was rediscovered because of his great influence on the Baroque style during the Counter Reformation || 
|-id=149
| 12149 Begas || 9099 P-L || Begas is the name of a German family of nineteenth-century artists, of whom the best known was Romantik-style painter Carl Joseph Begas (1794–1854). Of his four sons, Reinhold (1831–1911) and Carl Begas Jr. (1845–1916), were sculptors, and Oskar (1828–1883) and Adalbert (1836–1888) Begas were painters || 
|-id=150
| 12150 De Ruyter || 1051 T-1 || Michiel de Ruyter (1607–1676), in Dutch history a famous admiral, played a decisive role in the Anglo-Dutch Wars of the seventeenth century. De Ruyter was of humble origin but much loved by his sailors and soldiers. The name was suggested by C. E. Koppeschaar. || 
|-id=151
| 12151 Oranje-Nassau || 1220 T-1 || William the Silent, Prince of Orange (1533–1584), led the Netherlands provinces in their war of liberation against Spain during 1568–1648. "The Father of the Fatherland" was assassinated and is entombed in the Nieuwe Kerk in Delft. The Dutch national anthem, the Wilhelmus, was written in his honor || 
|-id=152
| 12152 Aratus || 1287 T-1 || Aratus of Soli (c. 315 BC/310 BC – 240 BC)) a Hellenistic poet and author of the Phaenomena, an influential didactic poem composed around 275 B.C. that describes the celestial sphere, the constellations and weather prognostications based on their rising and setting || 
|-id=153
| 12153 Conon || 3219 T-1 || Conon of Samos (c. 280-c. 220 B.C.) was a Hellenistic astronomer and mathematician who worked in Alexandria. In 246 B.C. he created the constellation of Coma Berenices, commemorating the sacrifice of Queen Berenice's tresses of hair after her husband's return from the Third Syrian War || 
|-id=154
| 12154 Callimachus || 3329 T-1 || Callimachus (c. 305–240 B.C.) was a Hellenistic scholar and poet who worked in Alexandria, where he compiled a catalogue of the famous library. He wrote the poem Aetia commemorating the creation of the eponymous constellation Coma Berenices by Conon of Samos in 246 B.C || 
|-id=155
| 12155 Hyginus || 4193 T-1 || Gaius Julius Hyginus (c. 64 B.C. – A.D. 17), Roman historian, philologer and mythographer, presided over the Palatine Library in Rome. His De Astronomia (or Poeticon Astronomicon) gives a comprehensive overview of the myths associated with the constellations. The name was suggested by R. H. van Gent || 
|-id=156
| 12156 Ubels || 1042 T-2 || Egbert Ubels (1969–2008), Dutch fireman who perished on 9 May 2008 while fighting a shipyard fire in De Punt (Drenthe, Netherlands), along with colleagues Raymond Patrick Soyer and Anne Kregel || 
|-id=157
| 12157 Können || 1070 T-2 || Günther Peter Können (born 1944), a researcher at the Koninklijk Nederlands Meteorologisch Instituut, specialized in atmospheric optics. He is famous for his book Polarized light in Nature, which describes phenomena such as halos and rainbows. The name was suggested by M. Drummen || 
|-id=158
| 12158 Tape || 1101 T-2 || Walter Tape (born 1941) is an Alaskan mathematician. With his book Atmospheric halos he made an outstanding contribution to the popularization of these beautiful phenomena. The name was suggested by G. P. Können and M. Drummen || 
|-id=159
| 12159 Bettybiegel || 1142 T-2 || Rebekka A. "Betty" Biegel (1886–1943) studied astronomy in Leiden, obtained her doctorate in Zürich, pursued psychology in Utrecht and developed psychological instruments for testing people. She committed suicide by cyanide rather than allow herself to be transported to Auschwitz. The name was suggested by W. R. Dick || 
|-id=160
| 12160 Karelwakker || 1152 T-2 || Karel F. Wakker (born 1944), professor of astrodynamics at Delft Technical University, has made important contributions to Dutch, ESA and NASA space projects, as well as inspiring numerous students. || 
|-id=161
| 12161 Avienius || 1158 T-2 || Avienius, who lived in the second half of the 4th century, was a Latin poet from Etruria. He composed didactic poems on astronomy and geography. His Aratea was based on earlier Latin translations of Aratus' Phaenomena. The name was suggested by R. H. van Gent || 
|-id=162
| 12162 Bilderdijk || 2145 T-2 || Willem Bilderdijk (1756–1831) was a Dutch poet and scholar who composed two didactic astronomical poems, Starrenkennis (1794) and De Starrenhemel (1807). These described the celestial sphere, the Milky Way and the constellations. The name was suggested by R. H. van Gent || 
|-id=163
| 12163 Manilius || 3013 T-2 || Marcus Manilius (1st century AD), was a Roman poet and astrologer who wrote the comprehensive astronomical-astrological poem Astronomica. The five-volume work was dedicated to Tiberius and contains a mythological description of the constellations and the Milky Way. The name was suggested by R. H. van Gent. || 
|-id=164
| 12164 Lowellgreen || 3067 T-2 || Lowell Clark Green (born 1925), a Lutheran pastor/theologian for more than half a century and Renaissance/Reformation scholar, now resident in Buffalo, New York, has given constant support and encouragement to the life and astronomical career of his son, D. W. E. Green, who found the identifications for this object. || 
|-id=165
| 12165 Ringleb || 3289 T-2 || Peter Ringleb (born 1965), German neurologist, member of the team who cared for co– discoverer Ingrid van Houten-Groeneveld || 
|-id=166
| 12166 Oliverherrmann || 3372 T-2 || Oliver Herrmann (born 1973), German neurologist, member of the team who cared for co– discoverer Ingrid van Houten-Groeneveld || 
|-id=167
| 12167 Olivermüller || 4306 T-2 || Oliver Müller (born 1971), German cardiologist, member of the team who cared for co– discoverer Ingrid van Houten-Groeneveld || 
|-id=168
| 12168 Polko || 5141 T-2 || Norbert Polko (born 1944) has scanned more than 200,000 glass plates, a world record, from the largest European astronomical plate archive, at the Sonneberg Observatory. The name was suggested by R. Hudec. || 
|-id=169
| 12169 Munsterman || 2031 T-3 || Henk Munsterman (born 1946), a Dutch amateur astrophotographer, known for his photographs of planets, minor planets, comets, nebulae, starclusters and galaxies. The name was suggested by Mat Drummen, see . || 
|-id=170
| 12170 Vanvollenhoven || 2372 T-3 || Pieter van Vollenhoven (born 1939), Dutch professor of risk management at the Technical University of Twente and Dutch ambassador of the International Year of Astronomy || 
|-id=171
| 12171 Johannink || 2382 T-3 || Carl F. Johannink (born 1959) is a Dutch high-school teacher and amateur astronomer. His main interests lie in meteor astronomy. He is a very prolific meteor observer, active within the Dutch Meteor Society. The name was suggested by K. Miskotte || 
|-id=172
| 12172 Niekdekort || 2390 T-3 || Niek De Kort (born 1956) has done outstanding work popularizing astronomy. He authored several books, including one about space research and the course book Modern Astronomy (1980) for a TV course with an enrollment of 25~000 people. The name was suggested by H. van Woerden and A. v. d. Brugge || 
|-id=173
| 12173 Lansbergen || 3135 T-3 || Philippus Lansbergen (1561–1632), Calvinist minister and active astronomical researcher in Middelburg, The Netherlands, in 1629 wrote the first popular book on astronomy in the Dutch language. The book promoted the Copernican system and became a best seller. || 
|-id=174
| 12174 van het Reve || 3164 T-3 || Karel van het Reve (1921–1999), professor of Slavic languages at Leiden University and a prolific writer, was considered to be one of the finest Dutch essayists with wide-ranging interests. The name was suggested by F. Israel || 
|-id=175
| 12175 Wimhermans || 3197 T-3 || Willem Frederik Hermans (1921–1995), a Dutch author considered one of the most important writers in the Netherlands in the postwar period. His oeuvre includes novels, short stories, plays, along with poetry and essays, as well as philosophical and scientific works. The name was suggested by F. Israel || 
|-id=176
| 12176 Hidayat || 3468 T-3 || Bambang Hidayat (born 1934) is an active promoter of astronomy in Indonesia. Known for his work on visual binaries and H-emission-line stars, he was director of Bosscha Observatory in Lembang during 1968–1999 and vice-president of the IAU during 1994–2000 || 
|-id=177
| 12177 Raharto || 4074 T-3 || Moedji Raharto (born 1954) is an Indonesian astronomer and senior lecturer at the Institut Teknologi Bandung. He was director of Bosscha Observatory in Lembang during 2000–2003 and is an authority on Galactic structure, based on the Hipparcos and IRAS-Point Source catalogues. || 
|-id=178
| 12178 Dhani || 4304 T-3 || Herdiwijaya Dhani (born 1963), an Indonesian astronomer and solar physicist. He was director of Bosscha Observatory in Lembang during 2004–2005. He is known for his work on binaries, solar magnetic activity and its influence on weather and climate. || 
|-id=179
| 12179 Taufiq || 5030 T-3 || Taufiq Hidayat (born 1965), an Indonesian astronomer and associate professor at the Institut Teknologi Bandung. He was director of Bosscha Observatory in Lembang during 2006–2009. Known for work on the solar system and extrasolar transits, he actively fights the adverse effects of urbanisation around the observatory || 
|-id=180
| 12180 Kistemaker || 5167 T-3 || Jacob Kistemaker (1917–2010), Teylers professor at Leiden University, was a pioneer in isotope separation, uranium enrichment, atomic and molecular collisions, and vacuum science and technology. Name suggested by H. Habing and F. Saris. || 
|-id=182
| 12182 Storm ||  || Theodor Storm (1817–1888), a German writer and local judge in his northern German hometown Husum. He wrote impressive poems and more than 50 novels. As a representative of "poetic realism", he described the landscapes and the people of his north Frisian coastal district. || 
|-id=183
| 12183 Caltonen ||  || Craig Steven Altonen (born 1965) is the Chief Engineer for the Lucy mission. || 
|-id=184
| 12184 Trevormerkley ||  || Trevor Franklin Merkley (born 1983) is the "Spacecraft Fault Protection Lead" of the Lucy mission. He also developed the software for Lucys photovoltaic array deployment. || 
|-id=185
| 12185 Gasprinskij ||  || Ismail Gasprinskij (1851–1914) was a Crimean-Tatar teacher, enlightener, writer, publisher and public figure. || 
|-id=186
| 12186 Mitukurigen ||  || Mitukuri Genpo (1799–1863), a physician of Western medicine in the late Edo period. || 
|-id=187
| 12187 Lenagoryunova ||  || Elena (Lena) Viktorovna Goryunova (born 1961), hydrologist at Sebastopol Institute of Hydrography. || 
|-id=188
| 12188 Kalaallitnunaat || 1978 PE || Greenland is an autonomous country within the Kingdom of Denmark. Located on the largest island in the world, it has been inhabited during many millennia by indigenous arctic peoples with strong and unique cultural traditions, later joined by people from the Nordic countries. || 
|-id=189
| 12189 Dovgyj ||  || Stanislav Alekseevich Dovgyj (born 1954), a corresponding member of the Ukrainian National Academy of Sciences, is a scientist in the field of mechanics. || 
|-id=190
| 12190 Sarkisov ||  || Pavel Djibraelovich Sarkisov (born 1932), rector of the D. I. Mendeleev Moscow Chemical-Technological University. || 
|-id=191
| 12191 Vorontsova ||  || Margarita Alekseevna Vorontsova (born 1923), a pediatrician at the Simferopol children's hospital || 
|-id=192
| 12192 Gregbollendonk ||  || Gregory R. Bollendonk (born 1960) is the "Spacecraft Systems Engineer" of the Lucy mission and accompanied Lucys development from concept study to its launch. || 
|-id=195
| 12195 Johndavidniemann ||  || John David Niemann (born 1984) is the Mission Assurance Manager of the Lucy mission. || 
|-id=196
| 12196 Weems ||  || Weyman Weems (born 1965) is the "Solar Array Principal Engineer" of the Lucy mission. || 
|-id=197
| 12197 Jan-Otto ||  || Jan-Otto Carlsson (born 1943) is professor of inorganic chemistry at Uppsala University and has for nine years been the dean of the Faculty of Sciences and Technology. || 
|-id=199
| 12199 Sohlman ||  || Michael Sohlman (born 1944) is a well-known Swedish specialist in economics and finance, executive director of the Nobel Fund, a member of the Royal Swedish Academy of Sciences and the Royal Swedish Academy of Engineering Sciences. || 
|-id=200
| 12200 Richlipe ||  || Richard Loyde Lipe Jr. (born 1964) is the Program Manager and Engineering Manager of the Lucy mission at Lockheed Martin Space. || 
|}

12201–12300 

|-
| 12201 Spink ||  || James W. Spink (born 1963) is the Program Manager for the Northrop Grumman's photovoltaic system. The UltraFlex solar array is an accordion fanfold blanket made of triangular-shaped lightweight panels that form a shallow umbrella-shaped membrane structure when tensioned (Src). || 
|-id=202
| 12202 Toddgregory ||  || Todd Gregory (born 1968) is the Technical Director for the photovoltaic array of the Lucy mission. || 
|-id=203
| 12203 Gehling ||  || Russell Neel Gehling (born 1959) was the "Solar Array Principal Engineer of the Lucy mission, until his retirement. || 
|-id=204
| 12204 Jonpineau ||  || Jon Paul Pineau (born 1978) is the "Aerospace Engineer" and "Lead Science Operations Center (SOC) Systems Engineer" for the Lucy mission. || 
|-id=205
| 12205 Basharp ||  || Bret Alan Sharp (born 1964) contributed to NASA's is the "Spacecraft Engineering Manager", "Thermal Manager", and the "Propulsion Manager" of the Lucy mission. || 
|-id=206
| 12206 Prats ||  || Rebecca Maria Prats (born 1989) is the Configuration Manager of the Lucy mission. || 
|-id=207
| 12207 Matthewbeasley ||  || Matthew Beasley (born 1973) is the "Deputy Payload Systems Engineer" of the Lucy mission. || 
|-id=208
| 12208 Jacobenglander ||  || Jacob Aldo Englander (born 1984) is the "Trajectory Optimization Lead" of the Lucy mission. || 
|-id=210
| 12210 Prykull ||  || Cory J. Prykull (born 1992) is the "Assembly, Test, and Launch Operations Mechanical Operations Lead" of the Lucy mission. || 
|-id=211
| 12211 Arnoschmidt || 1981 KJ || Arno Schmidt, German novelist. || 
|-id=214
| 12214 Miroshnikov ||  || Mikhail Mikhailovich Miroshnikov (born 1926), director of the Vavilov State Optical Institute from 1966 to 1989. || 
|-id=215
| 12215 Jessicalounsbury ||  || Jessica Lounsbury (née Thompson, born 1979) is the "NASA Project Systems Engineer" of the Lucy mission. || 
|-id=218
| 12218 Fleischer || 1982 RK || Randall Craig Fleischer (born 1959), the ebullient and multi-talented music director and conductor of the Flagstaff Symphony Orchestra. || 
|-id=219
| 12219 Grigorʹev ||  || Mikhail Grigorʹevich Grigorʹev, Russian chief (1957–1962) of the space-vehicle launch site now known as the Plesetsk Cosmodrome (see also 11824) || 
|-id=220
| 12220 Semenchur ||  || Semen Ivanovich Churyumov, Ukrainian doctor of philosophy and socionics, senior lecturer in the mathematics department at the Kiev National Aviation University || 
|-id=221
| 12221 Ogatakoan ||  || Ogata Koan (1810–1863), a medical doctor with knowledge of European medicine in the late Edo period. || 
|-id=222
| 12222 Perotto || 1982 WA || Pier Giorgio Perotto, Italian electronics engineer || 
|-id=223
| 12223 Hoskin || 1983 TX || Michael A. Hoskin (born 1930) founded the Journal for the History of Astronomy in 1970 and has since served as its editor. He established the archives at Churchill College, Cambridge, is a leading expert on William Herschel and has done pioneering archeoastronomical work around the western Mediterranean basin. || 
|-id=224
| 12224 Jimcornell ||  || James Cornell, American astronomer || 
|-id=225
| 12225 Yanfernández || 1985 PQ || Yanga Rolando Fernández, Canadian astronomer † ‡ || 
|-id=226
| 12226 Caseylisse || 1985 TN || Carey M. ("Casey") Lisse (born 1961) is an expert on cometary dust and has made significant contributions to understanding the size distribution of the dust using infrared observations. The name was suggested by M. F. A'Hearn. || 
|-id=227
| 12227 Penney ||  || Big John Penney is representative of the team of workers who find a deep and abiding love for the challenges and rigors of wintering at South Pole Station. || 
|-id=229
| 12229 Paulsson ||  || Rolf Paulsson (born 1943), a lecturer at Uppsala University, has been an outstanding teacher of theoretical physics for generations of students || 
|-id=234
| 12234 Shkuratov ||  || Yurij G. Shkuratov (born 1952) is director of the Institute of Astronomy of Kharkiv National University. He is a well known expert in the theory of light scattering and in optical measurements of laboratory analogues of asteroid regolith and cometary particles. The citation was written by D. F. Lupishko. || 
|-id=235
| 12235 Imranakperov ||  || Akperov Imran Guru Ogly (born 1958), professor of economics and president of the inter-regional association of non-state education institutes in southern Russia, is also founder and rector of an institute in Rostov-on-Don. The name was suggested by S. S. Svetashev and R. Y. Gurnikovskaya. || 
|-id=237
| 12237 Coughlin || 1987 HE || Thomas B. Coughlin, of the Near Earth Asteroid Rendezvous (NEAR) mission team and programs manager of the Applied Physics Laboratory of Johns Hopkins University. || 
|-id=238
| 12238 Actor ||  || Actor, the alleged father of Cteatos and Eurytos, two Greek warriors who beat Nestor in the chariot race. || 
|-id=239
| 12239 Carolinakou ||  || Carolina Carreira Nakou (born 2001), the daughter of Sandra Carreira and Thodoris Nakos. The latter works on galactic lenses at the Royal Observatory at Uccle. || 
|-id=240
| 12240 Droste-Hülshoff ||  || Annette von Droste-Hülshoff, German author and poet. || 
|-id=241
| 12241 Lefort ||  || Gertrud Freiin von le Fort (1876–1971), German poet. || 
|-id=242
| 12242 Koon || 1988 QY || Koon, a notable fighter, the eldest son of Antenor. || 
|-id=244
| 12244 Werfel ||  || Franz Werfel, Czech poet. || 
|-id=246
| 12246 Pliska ||  || Pliska was the first capital of the Bulgarian state, founded in 681. The conversion into Christianity under Knayz Boris I took place in Pliska in 855. There he welcomed the disciples of the brothers Saint Cyril and Saint Methodius, creators of the Slavic alphabet. It is also the birthplace of the discoverer || 
|-id=247
| 12247 Michaelsekerak ||  || Michael James Sekerak (born 1977) is the "NASA Deputy Project Systems Engineer" of the Lucy mission. || 
|-id=248
| 12248 Russellcarpenter ||  || James Russell Carpenter (born 1966) is the "Goddard Space Flight Center Technical Deputy Manager for Space Science Mission Operations" for the OSIRIS-REx and the Lucy mission. || 
|-id=252
| 12252 Gwangju ||  || Gwangju, Korea, became the seventh friendship city of Sendai, Japan on 20 April 2002. Gwangju and Sendai are famous for their cultural, artistic and academic facilities, and each will host World Cup soccer games this year. || 
|-id=257
| 12257 Lassine ||  || George Lassine (1953–2003), a member of the Belgian astronomical club Astronomie Centre Ardenne-Neufchâteau. || 
|-id=258
| 12258 Oscarwilde ||  || Oscar Wilde, Irish playwright, poet, and writer. || 
|-id=259
| 12259 Szukalski ||  || Albert Szukalski (1945–2000), Polish-born Belgian sculptor who worked in Antwerp and sometimes used very eccentric means for establishing his work. One of his foremost pieces of art concerns "La Cena", a monument of 13 statues that has been erected in the Nevada desert. || 
|-id=261
| 12261 Ledouanier ||  || Henri Rousseau, French post-impressionist painter, nicknamed "Le Douanier" ("The Customs Officer"). || 
|-id=262
| 12262 Nishio || 1989 UL || Tomoaki Nishio (born 1963), an editor of Gekkan Tenmon Guide, the Japanese monthly astronomical magazine. || 
|-id=267
| 12267 Denneau ||  || Larry Denneau (born 1968), American software engineer for the Moving Object Processing System of Pan-STARRS || 
|-id=270
| 12270 Bozar ||  || The name "Bozar" for the Palais des Beaux-Arts in Brussels was inspired by the language of Brussels residents. || 
|-id=272
| 12272 Geddylee ||  || Geddy Lee (Gary Lee Weinrib), Canadian bassist, vocalist and keyboardist for the band Rush || 
|-id=275
| 12275 Marcelgoffin ||  || Marcel Goffin (1913–1999), an accomplished amateur violin maker. || 
|-id=276
| 12276 IJzer ||  || IJzer, a river in Flanders. || 
|-id=277
| 12277 Tajimasatonokai ||  || Tajimasatonokai is an astronomy group which has long been engaged in popularizing astronomy by holding public viewing events and lectures around Toyooka city, Hyogo prefecture. || 
|-id=278
| 12278 Kisohinoki ||  || Japanese cypresses (hinoki), especially the Kiso cypresses (Kiso hinoki, in Japanese), were used as building materials for castles during the Edo era. They were protected like human beings. The Kiso cypresses form a natural forest 400 years old. || 
|-id=279
| 12279 Laon ||  || Laon, the capital of the Aisne department in northern France. || 
|-id=280
| 12280 Reims ||  || Reims, a city in the French department of Marne, the old capital (Durocortorum, later Remi) of the Roman province Belgica. || 
|-id=281
| 12281 Chaumont ||  || Chaumont, Haute-Marne, France || 
|-id=282
| 12282 Crombecq ||  || Michelle Crombecq (born 1946), a secretary at the port of Antwerp. || 
|-id=284
| 12284 Pohl || 1991 FP || Frederik Pohl, American author †  || 
|-id=286
| 12286 Poiseuille ||  || Jean Louis Marie Poiseuille (1797–1869) was a French physicist and physiologist who, through his work on the pressure of blood, became interested in the resistance of the flow of viscous fluids in small tubes. This led to the formulation of the Hagen-Poiseuille Law. The unit of viscosity is named the poise || 
|-id=287
| 12287 Langres ||  || Langres, a French city in the south of the Haute-Marne department. || 
|-id=288
| 12288 Verdun ||  || Verdun, France. || 
|-id=289
| 12289 Carnot ||  || Nicolas Léonard Sadi Carnot, (1796–1832) a French physicist. || 
|-id=291
| 12291 Gohnaumann ||  || Gottfried O. H. Naumann (born 1935) is the director of the Universitäts-Augenklinik in Erlangen-Nürnberg and president of the International Council of Ophthalmology. He is considered one of the foremost ophthalmologists in the world and has received many honors. || 
|-id=292
| 12292 Dalton ||  || John Dalton, British physicist and chemist. || 
|-id=294
| 12294 Avogadro ||  || Amedeo Avogadro, Italian scientist. || 
|-id=295
| 12295 Tasso ||  || Torquato Tasso, an Italian writer and poet. || 
|-id=298
| 12298 Brecht ||  || Bertolt Brecht, German dramatist, stage director, and poet. || 
|}

12301–12400 

|-
| 12301 Eötvös ||  || Loránd Eötvös, Hungarian physicist. || 
|-id=306
| 12306 Pebronstein ||  || Peter Bronstein (born 1947), father in-law of the discoverer. || 
|-id=309
| 12309 Tommygrav ||  || Tommy Grav, Norwegian astronomer || 
|-id=310
| 12310 Londontario ||  || London, Ontario, the Canadian city. || 
|-id=311
| 12311 Ingemyr ||  || Mikael Ingemyr (born 1991), a student at the high school for space studies in Kiruna, was one of the winners of "The Universe—yours to discover with the Nordic Optical Telescope" || 
|-id=312
| 12312 Väte ||  || Väte is a small parish on Gotland with a church from the thirteenth century. Here can also be found an old farm, Norrbys, reflecting agricultural life 70 years ago || 
|-id=317
| 12317 Madicampbell ||  || Margaret Diane Campbell (born 1976), a Ph.D. student at the University of Western Ontario, became interested in astronomy as a young girl. || 
|-id=318
| 12318 Kästner ||  || Erich Kästner, German author and journalist. || 
|-id=320
| 12320 Loschmidt ||  || Josef Loschmidt (1821–1895), Czech physicist. || 
|-id=321
| 12321 Zurakowski ||  || Paul R. Zurakowski (born 1927), volunteer director of the Chabot Observatory Telescope Makers' Workshop for more than 30 years. || 
|-id=323
| 12323 Haeckel || 1992 RX || Ernst Haeckel (1834–1919), German naturalist. || 
|-id=324
| 12324 Van Rompaey ||  || Pierre Van Rompaey (born 1921) is a Belgian architect and an artist of surreal figurative paintings. His popular work is displayed in private collections at Antwerp. || 
|-id=325
| 12325 Bogota ||  || Bogotá, the capital of Colombia || 
|-id=326
| 12326 Shirasaki || 1992 SF || Shuichi Shirasaki (born 1958), an anesthesiologist in Sapporo city, was the finalist in the selection of a Japanese astronaut candidate by the National Space Development Agency of Japan in 1999. || 
|-id=327
| 12327 Terbrüggen ||  || Dietrich Terbrüggen (born 1941), a well-known German surgeon. || 
|-id=329
| 12329 Liebermann ||  || Max Liebermann (1847–1935), a German painter. || 
|-id=335
| 12335 Tatsukushi ||  || Tatsukushi is a beach on the western side of Ashizuri peninsular in Kochi prefecture known for the unusual sight of rock pillars of various sizes sculpted by waves. An undersea viewing tower is built there to see many kinds of rare fishes. || 
|-id=339
| 12339 Carloo ||  || Carloo, a small hamlet south of the Royal Observatory at Uccle. || 
|-id=340
| 12340 Stalle ||  || Stalle, a hamlet in the eastern part of the municipality of Uccle. || 
|-id=341
| 12341 Calevoet ||  || Calevoet is a hamlet in the southwestern part of the municipality of Uccle. The name means "grassless ford". However, the name also means "bare foot", which gave birth to the legend that Charlemagne crossed the small river at Calevoet barefooted. || 
|-id=342
| 12342 Kudohmichiko ||  || Michiko Kudoh (born 1942) has been associated with the Gotoh Planetarium and Astronomical Museum in Tokyo. She reaches out to other astronomers through her web site. || 
|-id=343
| 12343 Martinbeech ||  || Martin Beech (born 1959) is an assistant professor of astronomy at the University of Regina, Saskatchewan. He does research on meteor light curves, the dynamics of meteoroid streams, cometary aging and meteoroid-stream formation. || 
|-id=350
| 12350 Feuchtwanger ||  || Lion Feuchtwanger, a German author. || 
|-id=352
| 12352 Jepejacobsen ||  || Jens Peter Jacobsen, a Danish writer and poet. || 
|-id=353
| 12353 Màrquez ||  || Gabriel Garc{í}a Màrquez (1927–2014), a Colombian novelist. || 
|-id=354
| 12354 Hemmerechts ||  || Kristien Hemmerechts, a Flemish author. || 
|-id=355
| 12355 Coelho ||  || Paulo Coelho (born 1947), a Brazilian lyricist and novelist. || 
|-id=356
| 12356 Carlscheele ||  || Carl Wilhelm Scheele, a Swedish apothecary. || 
|-id=357
| 12357 Toyako ||  || Lake Tōya ("Toyako" in Japanese), part of Shikotsu-Tōya National Park in Hokkaido || 
|-id=358
| 12358 Azzurra ||  || Azzurra (born 2010 Jan. 4) is the grandchild of the discoverer. Her name is a hope for clearer skies || 
|-id=359
| 12359 Cajigal ||  || With his founding in 1831 of the Military Academy of Mathematics, Juan Manuel Cajigal y Odoardo (1803–1856) initiated the study of mathematics and engineering in Venezuela. His installation of the first astronomical telescopes in Caracas was recognized with the establishment of El Observatorio Cajigal there in 1888. || 
|-id=360
| 12360 Unilandes ||  || The Universidad de Los Andes, founded in Mérida in 1785, is one of the most important educational institutions in Venezuela. || 
|-id=362
| 12362 Mumuryk ||  || Mumuryk Keiko Yuharo (born 1959) is a painter and illustrator. Having started painting as a 4-year-old, she works in oil, water, engraving and relief. Her illustrations were used for posters by the Japanese International Space Station and the STS-123 Mission. || 
|-id=363
| 12363 Marinmarais ||  || Marin Marais (1656–1728), the central figure in the French school of bass-viol composers and performers that flourished during the late 17th and early 18th centuries. || 
|-id=364
| 12364 Asadagouryu ||  || Asada Gouryu (1734–1799), an astronomer in the Japanese Edo period, studied positional astronomy. He also founded "Senjikan", a private school in astronomy, in Osaka, and educated many outstanding astronomers, including Takashi Yoshitoki and Hazama Shigetomi. || 
|-id=365
| 12365 Yoshitoki || 1993 YD || Takahashi Yoshitoki (1764–1804) was chief of the Edo National Astronomical Observatory at Edo, Japan, from 1795 to 1804. He mainly studied positional astronomy, devising a new calendar computation method, "Kansei reki", with Hazama Shigetomi. || 
|-id=366
| 12366 Luisapla ||  || Luisa Pla, Spanish-Venezuelan teacher of French, born in Villarrobledo co-founder (with her husband, Manuel Sanchez Jordan) of the Lope de Vega high school in Valencia, founder of Spanish history studies at La Universidad de Carabobo || 
|-id=367
| 12367 Ourinhos ||  || Ourinhos, São Paulo, Brazil || 
|-id=368
| 12368 Mutsaers ||  || Charlotte Mutsaers, Dutch writer † || 
|-id=369
| 12369 Pirandello ||  || Luigi Pirandello (1867–1936), a Sicilian writer. || 
|-id=370
| 12370 Kageyasu ||  || Takahashi Kageyasu (1785–1829) was the chief astronomer of the shogunal government of Japan. He was among the first to compile and publish maps of the world and East Asia based on the latest knowledge then available in scientific geography. He also established the book office of Western culture in 1811. || 
|-id=372
| 12372 Kagesuke || 1994 JF || Shibukawa Kagesuke (1787–1856), chief of the Edo National Astronomical Observatory in Edo, Japan, from 1809 to 1856.  || 
|-id=373
| 12373 Lancearmstrong ||  || Lance Armstrong (born 1971), an American cyclist and cancer survivor. || 
|-id=374
| 12374 Rakhat ||  || Rakhat, a planet with the first known extraterrestrial life in the novel The Sparrow, by Mary Doria Russell. First contact is established when a group of specialists organized by Jesuits is sent to the planet. || 
|-id=376
| 12376 Cochabamba ||  || Cochabamba, a city in Bolivia. || 
|-id=378
| 12378 Johnston ||  || David Macarthur Johnston (1928–2022), an Australian farmer from Baradine, who was a birdwatcher in the Pilliga forest and an organizer of bird surveys. || 
|-id=379
| 12379 Thulin ||  || Ingrid Thulin (1929–2004), a Swedish screen actor. || 
|-id=380
| 12380 Sciascia ||  || Leonardo Sciascia (1921–1989), a Sicilian novelist and polemicist. || 
|-id=381
| 12381 Hugoclaus ||  || Hugo Claus, Flemish writer. || 
|-id=382
| 12382 Niagara Falls ||  || Niagara Falls † || 
|-id=383
| 12383 Eboshi ||  || Eboshi-iwa (also known as Uba Shima), a large hat-shaped rock visible from the coast, symbol of Southern Beach of Chigasaki, Kanagawa prefecture || 
|-id=384
| 12384 Luigimartella ||  || Luigi Martella (born 1956), a well-known Italian amateur astronomer. || 
|-id=386
| 12386 Nikolova ||  || Simona Rumenova Nikolova (born 1971), a graduate student at the University of Western Ontario, calculated comet data at the Royal Astronomical Observatory in Sofia and studied at the University of Regina, Saskatchewan. || 
|-id=387
| 12387 Tomokofujiwara ||  || Tomoko Fujiwara (born 1975) is an assistant professor at the Kyushu University. Her main interest consists of the long-term variability of stars and historical records of astronomy. She has been a member of IAU Commission 27 since 2006. The name was suggested by M. Hirai and K. Hurukawa. || 
|-id=388
| 12388 Kikunokai ||  || The traditional dance troupe "Kikunokai" was established in 1972 by Michiyo Hata (Onoe Kikunori). The Kikunokai has created numerous dance numbers that are based on classical Japanese dance and have been performed in many countries. || 
|-id=391
| 12391 Ecoadachi ||  || Adachi Ward (Eco-Adachi Ward), one of 23 wards of Tokyo, known for its environmentalism || 
|-id=395
| 12395 Richnelson ||  || Richard Nelson (born 1966) is well known for his work in developing computer simulations for n -body systems and applying these to planet formation, both in our solar system and in other systems. || 
|-id=396
| 12396 Amyphillips ||  || Amy Phillips (born 1956) received her MS in Optical Sciences from the University of Arizona. She has studied issues in remote sensing and properties of optical materials in harsh environments. She has also worked in the field of intellectual property, and is active in rural and suburban land-use issues. || 
|-id=397
| 12397 Peterbrown ||  || Peter Gordon Brown (born 1970) studied at the University of Alberta and the University of Western Ontario and was appointed to the faculty of the latter. His specialties are meteoroid streams, meteor analysis and meteorite recovery. || 
|-id=398
| 12398 Pickhardt ||  || Wilhelm Pickhardt (born 1923) studied geology at the Rheinische-Friedrich-Wilhelms-Universität in Bonn. He conducted research at the Mining Research Institute for Bituminous Coal and held an adjunct professorship at the Technical University of Berlin. || 
|-id=399
| 12399 Bartolini || 1995 OD || Corrado Bartolini (born 1941), professor at the University of Bologna since 1970, has focused his interests on contact spectrophotometric binaries, RR Lyrae and magnetic stars and x-ray binaries. With colleagues, he was successful in 1997 in observing the first optical counterpart of a \gamma -ray burst. || 
|-id=400
| 12400 Katumaru ||  || Katumaru Okuni (born 1932), the younger brother of the discoverer. || 
|}

12401–12500 

|-
| 12401 Tucholsky ||  || Kurt Tucholsky (1890–1935), a German author who was a masterly critic of philistinism, nationalism, militarism and corruptibility. He wrote poems, chansons and stories. His best-known novels were Rheinsberg and Schloá Gripsholm. In 1933, he was expatriated from his homeland and later committed suicide. || 
|-id=405
| 12405 Nespoli || 1995 RK || Paolo Angelo Nespoli, Italian Mission Specialist astronaut || 
|-id=406
| 12406 Zvíkov ||  || Zvíkov Castle, Czech Republic † || 
|-id=407
| 12407 Riccardi ||  || The historian of mathematics Pietro Riccardi (1828–1898) wrote the monumental work Biblioteca Matematica italiana dall'origine della stampa ai primi anni del XIX secolo, an annotated bibliography of all the books published by Italian scientists during the nineteenth century || 
|-id=408
| 12408 Fujioka ||  || Hiroshi Fujioka (born 1946), born in Kuma Town, is an actor, martial artist, and a dedicated volunteer in Iraq, Ethiopia and Cambodia. Since his debut in 1970, he has starred in more than 20 movies and a number of TV dramas, including the most popular Japanese television program in the 1970s, Kamen Rider || 
|-id=409
| 12409 Bukovanská ||  || Marcela Bukovanská (born 1935), a research worker in meteoritics, was head of the department of mineralogy and petrology of the National Museum in Prague. Name suggested by M. Šolc. || 
|-id=410
| 12410 Donald Duck ||  || Donald Duck, the famous character of Walt Disney's cartoons, has amused generations of children and adults alike || 
|-id=411
| 12411 Tannokayo ||  || Kayo Tanno, Japanese elementary school teacher and science educator, who worked on the staff of the Saga prefecture Space and Science Museum during 2002–2006 || 
|-id=412
| 12412 Muchisachie ||  || Muchi Sachie, Japanese music teacher || 
|-id=413
| 12413 Johnnyweir ||  || Johnny Weir (born July 2, 1984), American athlete, figure-skating champion and Olympian, talented in many spheres of artistic endeavor || 
|-id=414
| 12414 Bure ||  || Pavel Bure, ice hockey player † || 
|-id=415
| 12415 Wakatatakayo ||  || Takayo Wakata, mother of the Japanese astronaut Koichi Wakata || 
|-id=418
| 12418 Tongling ||  || Tongling, Anhui || 
|-id=421
| 12421 Zhenya ||  || Eugenia Krysina (born 1952), a chemist who lives in Moscow, is a friend of the discoverer and displays a keen interest in astronomy, especially in minor planets. Zhenya is the diminutive form of Eugenia || 
|-id=423
| 12423 Slotin ||  || Louis Slotin, Canadian physicist and chemist † || 
|-id=426
| 12426 Racquetball ||  || Racquetball evolved from the Mayan Meso American ball game played throughout Central America from 2000 B.C. through 1500 A.D. Today the sport is played on a four-wall court by two to four players with a short racquet and a small rubber ball. John Africano, an AMOS team member, has a passion for playing the game. || 
|-id=431
| 12431 Webster ||  || Alan Reginald Webster (born 1939), a professor in the department of electrical and computer engineering at the University of Western Ontario, has research interests that include meteor astronomy. || 
|-id=432
| 12432 Usuda ||  || The Usuda Deep Space Center of the Japan Aerospace Exploration Agency, located in Saku city, Nagano prefecture, conducts command operations and receives telemetry and data from deep-space explorers such as Hayabusa and Kaguya. The site features a parabolic antenna of diameter 64 meters and weight 1980 tons || 
|-id=433
| 12433 Barbieri ||  || Giovanni Barbieri (born 1941) is an amateur astronomer in the Montelupo Group. || 
|-id=435
| 12435 Sudachi || 1996 BX || Citrus sudachi, a small, round, green citrus fruit that is a specialty of Tokushima prefecture, Japan || 
|-id=437
| 12437 Westlane ||  || Westlane Secondary School, Niagara Falls, Ontario, Canada † || 
|-id=439
| 12439 Okasaki ||  || During the past three decades amateur astronomer Kiyomi Okasaki (born 1950) has discovered two comets and three supernovae at his observatory in Kahoku, Yamagata prefecture || 
|-id=440
| 12440 Koshigayaboshi ||  || Koshigayaboshi, "the star of Koshigaya", southeast Saitama prefecture, Japan, in honour of the city's fiftieth anniversary in 2008 || 
|-id=442
| 12442 Beltramemass ||  || Massimiliano Beltrame (1942–2001) taught topography and the science of construction at a high school in Terni. He was also an amateur astronomer specializing in photography. An astronomy club in Terni has been named in his memory || 
|-id=443
| 12443 Paulsydney ||  || With the gracious support of his family, Paul Sydney, a physicist on the AMOS team, has dedicated many long hours to demonstrating that U.S. Air Force assets could be applied successfully to following up minor planets. In return, the Air Force has benefited significantly from collaboration with the astronomical community || 
|-id=444
| 12444 Prothoon ||  || Prothoon was a Trojan warrior who was killed by Teucer in the Trojan War || 
|-id=445
| 12445 Sirataka ||  || The town of Sirataka, where the discoverer was born, is located in the southern part of Yamagata prefecture. The town is famous for its textile industry and weir-fishing || 
|-id=446
| 12446 Juliabryant ||  || Australian astrophysicist Julia Bryant (born 1971) is recognized for her past, present and future contributions to science, family and friendship || 
|-id=447
| 12447 Yatescup ||  || Yates Cup, Canadian sports trophy † || 
|-id=448
| 12448 Mr. Tompkins ||  || Mr. Tompkins, character from George Gamow's books † || 
|-id=456
| 12456 Genichiaraki ||  || Genichi Araki (born 1954) is an amateur astronomer and a science teacher in Junior High School. He was one of the discoverers of comet C/1983 H1 (IRAS-Araki-Alcock) || 
|-id=460
| 12460 Mando ||  || Mando, the largest annual festival in Iruma, Saitama prefecture, involves thousands of lantern lights. Since 1978 the Mando Festival has been conducted with the coordinated efforts of the citizenry and administration under a theme of cooperation and communication || 
|-id=464
| 12464 Manhattan ||  || Manhattan, is the original island borough of New York City, which was obtained from the Indians by the Dutch in 1626. It became New York under the English in 1664, and is the commercial and cultural heart of the city. || 
|-id=465
| 12465 Perth Amboy ||  || The U.S. city of Perth Amboy, New Jersey city, was settled in 1683 and incorporated in 1718. It is an important industrial city and port of entry with a fine harbor near New York City. || 
|-id=468
| 12468 Zachotín ||  || Zachotín, Czech Republic †  || 
|-id=469
| 12469 Katsuura ||  || Katsuura is a city in Chiba prefecture, where one can enjoy the wide ocean and forested hills. The Katsuura Tracking and Communication Station of the Japan Aerospace Exploration Agency is located on a hill to conduct command operations and receive telemetry from satellites that observe the earth or the moon || 
|-id=470
| 12470 Pinotti ||  || Roberto Pinotti (born 1944), after getting his degree in political science in 1972, became a writer and amateur astronomer of the Montelupo Group || 
|-id=471
| 12471 Larryscherr ||  || Lawrence Scherr (born 1949), an optical engineer and lens designer, designed the optics for the NEAT/Oschin instrument. He has designed, built, tested or analyzed stray light for prototype medical instruments, intraocular lenses, scaterometers, large surveillance telescopes, automated optical test systems and Mars camera lenses || 
|-id=472
| 12472 Samadhi ||  || Samadhi Hindu/Buddhist concept || 
|-id=473
| 12473 Levi-Civita ||  || Tullio Levi-Civita (1873–1941), an Italian mathematician who developed and extended the tensor calculus, originally formulated by Ricci, which plays a central role in the theory of general relativity and in differential geometry. In 1938 Levi-Civita was removed from his professorship at the University of Rome because of his being Jewish. || 
|-id=477
| 12477 Haiku ||  || The Haiku, Japanese poetic form || 
|-id=478
| 12478 Suzukiseiji ||  || Seiji Suzuki (born 1933), a retired teacher, is secretary of the Yamagata Astronomers Liaison Conference (since 1997) and the Yamagata Astronomers Club || 
|-id=479
| 12479 Ohshimaosamu ||  || Osamu Ohshima (born 1954) is a high school teacher and one of Japan's leading observers of variable stars. He was a staff member at Bisei Astronomical Observatory and played an important role in the founding of the observatory, using his talent in mechanical and computer technology || 
|-id=481
| 12481 Streuvels ||  || Stijn Streuvels, Flemish writer † || 
|-id=482
| 12482 Pajka ||  || Paula Pravdová (born 1990) is the only daughter of the second discoverer. She inherited many of her father's interests (playing musical instruments, cycling, swimming, diving, singing, joking) and that is why she was very popular when visiting Modra Observatory. Pajka is her familiar name. || 
|-id=485
| 12485 Jenniferharris ||  || Jennifer Harris Trosper (born 1968) led the Mars Pathfinder Surface Operations Test program and was Flight Director for Mars Pathfinder when it landed on 1997 July 4 || 
|-id=490
| 12490 Leiden ||  || Leiden, Netherlands, seat of the University of Leiden † || 
|-id=491
| 12491 Musschenbroek ||  || Pieter van Musschenbroek, Dutch scientist, inventor of the Leyden jar † || 
|-id=492
| 12492 Tanais ||  || Tanais, ancient Greek name of the Don river || 
|-id=493
| 12493 Minkowski ||  || Hermann Minkowski (1864–1909) was awarded a prestigious prize from the Paris Academy of Sciences while still a student. He was Einstein's teacher at Zurich and later developed the concept of four-dimensional space-time—the mathematical foundation of the special theory of relativity. || 
|-id=494
| 12494 Doughamilton ||  || Douglas P. Hamilton (born 1/1/1966) is a dynamicist specializing in small particles in the solar system. His major contributions involve motions and resonances when several different forces are involved, work for which he received the American Astronomical Society's Urey prize in 1999. The name was suggested by M. A'Hearn. || 
|-id=496
| 12496 Ekholm ||  || Andreas G. Ekholm (1975–2001) was a planetary scientist who contributed to the fields of impact cratering processes, geophysics of icy satellites, and photometry of KBOs and Centaurs. He was also active in humanitarian causes before his premature death in an automobile accident in his native Sweden. || 
|-id=497
| 12497 Ekkehard ||  || Ekkehard Kührt (born 1954) is the head of the Asteroids and Comets Department of the DLR institute of Planetary Research. He has been active in minor bodies research for decades and was involved in many space missions. Ekkehard has been the project leader of the DLR contributions for the instruments of the Rosetta mission. || 
|-id=498
| 12498 Dragesco ||  || Jean Dragesco (born 1920) is an accomplished biologist and amateur astronomer. For many years, using various telescopes, he worked in Africa, where he made exquisite high-resolution photographs of the solar system that have inspired many amateur astronomers around the world. || 
|-id=500
| 12500 Desngai ||  || Desmond Ngai (born 1985), an ISEF awardee in 2002 || 
|}

12501–12600 

|-
| 12501 Nord ||  || Ashley Lynne Nord (born 1985), an ISEF awardee in 2002 || 
|-id=504
| 12504 Nuest ||  || Jennifer Elizabeth Nuest (born 1985), an ISEF awardee in 2002 || 
|-id=506
| 12506 Pariser ||  || Andrew Robert Pariser (born 1985), an ISEF awardee in 2002 || 
|-id=509
| 12509 Pathak ||  || Madhav Dilip Pathak (born 1987), an ISEF awardee in 2002 || 
|-id=511
| 12511 Patil ||  || Reshma Shivaputrappa Patil (born 1985), an ISEF awardee in 2002 || 
|-id=512
| 12512 Split ||  || Split is the largest Dalmatian city and the second-largest urban center in Croatia. Located on the shores of the eastern Adriatic Sea, it is a vital link to the numerous surrounding islands. The historic city of Split is built around the "Palace of Diocletian", the world's best preserved Roman palace || 
|-id=513
| 12513 Niven ||  || Ivan M. Niven, Canadian-American mathematician † || 
|-id=514
| 12514 Schommer ||  || Robert Schommer, an astronomer at Cerro Tololo InterAmerican Observatory. || 
|-id=515
| 12515 Suiseki ||  || Literally "Water-Stone" in Japanese, Suiseki is the Japanese art form of stone appreciation. || 
|-id=517
| 12517 Grayzeck ||  || Edwin John Grayzeck, American astronomer, Archive Manager, Small Bodies Node of the Planetary Data System, Department of Astronomy, University of Maryland, College Park † || 
|-id=519
| 12519 Pullen ||  || Sarah Adele Pullen (born 1985), an ISEF awardee in 2002 || 
|-id=522
| 12522 Rara ||  || Prem Vilas Fortran M. Rara, Filipino, an ISEF awardee in 2002 || 
|-id=524
| 12524 Conscience ||  || Hendrik Conscience (1812–1883), a founder of Flemish literature. || 
|-id=526
| 12526 de Coninck ||  || Herman de Coninck (1944–1997), a Flemish poet and critic. || 
|-id=527
| 12527 Anneraugh ||  || Anne C. Raugh (born 1962), an astronomer and informatician worked as a programmer for the COBE mission and for more than a decade has been the lead applications programmer for the Small Bodies Node of NASA's Planetary Data System at the University of Maryland. || 
|-id=529
| 12529 Reighard ||  || Chelsea Lynne Reighard (born 1986), an ISEF awardee in 2002 || 
|-id=530
| 12530 Richardson ||  || Aaron Cole Richardson (born 1984), an ISEF awardee in 2002 || 
|-id=533
| 12533 Edmond || 1998 LA || Edmond, a city in central Oklahoma, was founded on 1889 Apr. 22 in the first of the Oklahoma land runs. || 
|-id=534
| 12534 Janhoet ||  || Jan Hoet (1936–2014), a Belgian art curator, has studied art history and archeology. In 1975 he was appointed director of the Museum of Contemporary Art in Ghent. Well known from his exposition Documenta IX (Düsseldorf, 1992), he has been responsible for several expositions in Europe, Japan and Canada. || 
|-id=537
| 12537 Kendriddle ||  || Kendra LeeAnn Riddle (born 1983), an ISEF awardee in 2002 || 
|-id=539
| 12539 Chaikin ||  || Andrew L. Chaikin (born 1956), a renowned author and space historian whose interests include the Apollo program. His landmark book A Man on the Moon served as the basis for the HBO miniseries From the Earth to the Moon, which dramatized the first lunar exploration. || 
|-id=540
| 12540 Picander ||  || Picander, pseudonym of Christian Friedrich Henrici (1700–1764), was one of Bach's most important librettists. || 
|-id=541
| 12541 Makarska ||  || Makarska is a town located on a horseshoe-shaped bay between the Biokovo mountains and the Adriatic Sea in the Croatian region of Dalmatia. It is the center of the Makarska riviera and noted for its palm-fringed promenade. Its Franciscan monastery houses a renowned seashell collection || 
|-id=542
| 12542 Laver ||  || Rodney Laver (born 1938), a tennis player from the discoverer's home state of Queensland and widely regarded as one of the greats of the game. || 
|-id=548
| 12548 Erinriley ||  || Erin Kathleen Riley (born 1983), an ISEF awardee in 2002 || 
|-id=553
| 12553 Aaronritter ||  || Aaron M. Ritter (born 1986), an ISEF awardee in 2002 || 
|-id=556
| 12556 Kyrobinson ||  || Kylan Thomas Robinson (born 1985), an ISEF awardee in 2002 || 
|-id=557
| 12557 Caracol ||  || "El Caracol" at Chichén Itza in Yucatán, Mexico, has been described as probably the most famous of all the astronomically related buildings in ancient Mesoamerica. || 
|-id=561
| 12561 Howard ||  || Ron Howard American Actor, director, producer. || 
|-id=562
| 12562 Briangrazer ||  || Brian Grazer American Producer. || 
|-id=564
| 12564 Ikeller ||  || Ingeborg Bickel-Keller (born 1941), the discoverer's wife. || 
|-id=565
| 12565 Khege ||  || Keith Hege (born 1932), of Steward Observatory, University of Arizona, is an expert in high angular resolution astronomy and instrumentation. || 
|-id=566
| 12566 Derichardson ||  || Derek C. Richardson (born 1968), an expert on computational techniques of the University of Maryland, has made major contributions to the study of rubble piles, particularly their tidal distortion and their collisions. He is also applying his codes to the formation of planets. The name was suggested by M. F. A'Hearn and P. Michel. || 
|-id=567
| 12567 Herreweghe ||  || Philippe Herreweghe, Belgian conductor. || 
|-id=568
| 12568 Kuffner ||  || Moriz von Kuffner (1854–1939), Austrian brewer, alpinist and founder of the Kuffner Observatory in Vienna, Austria || 
|-id=572
| 12572 Sadegh ||  || Cameron Sadegh (born 1984), an ISEF awardee in 2002 || 
|-id=574
| 12574 LONEOS || 1999 RT || Lowell Observatory Near-Earth-Object Search (LONEOS). || 
|-id=575
| 12575 Palmaria ||  || Palmaria is the most important island in the gulf of La Spezia, famous for its old quarry of a rare golden marble nicknamed "Portoro". || 
|-id=576
| 12576 Oresme ||  || Nicole Oresme(c. 1323 – 1382), bishop of Lisieux, conceived the representation of time-varying quantities by two-dimensional graphs, using the latitude-longitude analogy. || 
|-id=577
| 12577 Samra ||  || Shamsher Singh Samra (born 1986), an ISEF awardee in 2002 || 
|-id=578
| 12578 Bensaur ||  || Benjamin Paul Saur (born 1983), an ISEF awardee in 2002 || 
|-id=579
| 12579 Ceva ||  || The brothers Giovanni (1647–1734) and Tommaso (1648–1737) Ceva were Italian mathematicians interested in geometry and physics. || 
|-id=580
| 12580 Antonini ||  || Pierre Antonini a French amateur astronomer, discoverer of minor planets and supernovae at his private Bedoin observatory || 
|-id=581
| 12581 Rovinj ||  || Rovinj is a city on the western coast of the Istrian peninsula. It was initially built on an island but connected to the mainland in the eighteenth century. Saint Euphemia's basilica overlooks the medieval city and its 22 offshore islands || 
|-id=583
| 12583 Buckjean ||  || the discoverer's father, a railroad conductor, and his mother, a registered nurse. || 
|-id=584
| 12584 Zeljkoandreic ||  || Željko Andreić (born 1957), a renowned Croatian amateur astronomer and promoter of astronomy. || 
|-id=585
| 12585 Katschwarz ||  || Kathleen Alice Schwarz (born 1984), an ISEF awardee in 2002 || 
|-id=593
| 12593 Shashlov ||  || Anthon Michailovich Shashlov (born 1986), an ISEF awardee in 2002 || 
|-id=595
| 12595 Amandashaw ||  || Amanda Bryce Shaw (born 1985), an ISEF awardee in 2002 || 
|-id=596
| 12596 Shukla ||  || Kavita M. Shukla (born 1984), an ISEF awardee in 2002 || 
|-id=598
| 12598 Sierra ||  || Elizabeth Sierra (born 1985), an ISEF awardee in 2002 || 
|-id=599
| 12599 Singhal ||  || Akshat Singhal (born 1985), an ISEF awardee in 2002 || 
|}

12601–12700 

|-
| 12601 Tiffanyswann ||  || Tiffany Nichole Swann (born 1985), an ISEF awardee in 2002 || 
|-id=602
| 12602 Tammytam ||  || Tammy Tam (born 1985), an ISEF awardee in 2002 || 
|-id=603
| 12603 Tanchunghee ||  || Tan Chun Ghee (born 1984), an ISEF awardee in 2002 || 
|-id=604
| 12604 Lisatate ||  || Lisa Michelle Tate (born 1986), an ISEF awardee in 2002 || 
|-id=606
| 12606 Apuleius || 2043 P-L || Lucius Apuleius, 2nd-century Roman writer and orator || 
|-id=607
| 12607 Alcaeus || 2058 P-L || Alcaeus, 7th–6th-century B.C. Greek poet || 
|-id=608
| 12608 Aesop || 2091 P-L || Aesop (Herodotus Aisopos of Sardes), 6th-century B.C. Greek slave who won his freedom with his fine fables || 
|-id=609
| 12609 Apollodoros || 2155 P-L || Apollodoros of Athens, 2nd-century B.C. Greek scholar and stoic, author of a much used Chronika || 
|-id=610
| 12610 Hãfez || 2551 P-L || Schamsoddin Mohammed Hãfez (1324–1390) was a Persian poet. Hãfez means "a person who knows The Koran by heart". He wrote in Persian and Arabic. When the Mongolians came to Persia they respected Hãfez. His lyric poetry is admired in Europe, and it influenced Goethe in his West-östlicher Divan. || 
|-id=611
| 12611 Ingres || 2555 P-L || Jean Auguste Dominique Ingres, 18th–19th-century French painter || 
|-id=612
| 12612 Daumier || 2592 P-L || Honoré Daumier, 19th-century French painter and lithographer || 
|-id=613
| 12613 Hogarth || 4024 P-L || William Hogarth, 18th-century English painter and copper-plate engraver || 
|-id=614
| 12614 Hokusai || 4119 P-L || Katsushika Hokusai, 18th–19th-century Japanese wood-carver and painter || 
|-id=615
| 12615 Mendesdeleon || 4626 P-L || Pablo Mendes de Leon (born 1954) has directed the International Institute of Air and Space Law since its creation in 1985 and is a recognized expert in the field. He was recently appointed professor of Air and Space Law at the University of Leiden and delivered his inaugural lecture on 2009 Apr. 17 || 
|-id=616
| 12616 Lochner || 4874 P-L || Stephan Lochner, 15th-century German painter of the Cologne school || 
|-id=617
| 12617 Angelusilesius || 5568 P-L || Angelus Silesius (Johannes Scheffler), 17th-century German baroque poet || 
|-id=618
| 12618 Cellarius || 6217 P-L || Andreas Cellarius (c. 1596–1665), a German schoolmaster from Neuhausen near Worms, settled in Amsterdam in the early 1620s, becoming rector of the Latin School in Hoorn in 1637. His Harmonia Macrocosmica, published 1660 in Amsterdam, ranks amongst the most spectacular celestial atlases of the seventeenth century || 
|-id=619
| 12619 Anubelshunu || 6242 P-L || Anu Belshunu (249 B.C.-c. 185 B.C.) was lamentation priest and interpreter of the astrological omen series Enuma Anu Enlil at the Temple of Anu in Uruk. A collection of astrological cuneiform tablets from his library contains some of the earliest realistic depictions of the Babylonian constellations || 
|-id=620
| 12620 Simaqian || 6335 P-L || Sima Qian (c. 145 B.C.-c. 85 B.C.) was a Chinese historian, counselor and court astrologer of the Han emperor Wu Di. He wrote a treatise on the Chinese calendar. His Shiji ("Records of the Grand Historian") contains the earliest systematical description of the Chinese constellations || 
|-id=621
| 12621 Alsufi || 6585 P-L || The Persian astronomer Abd al-Rahman al-Sufi (Azophi; 903–986) worked in Isfahan. His influential star atlas, completed around 964 and based on both Ptolemy's Almagest and pre-Islamic star lore, contains the earliest description of the Andromeda Galaxy, M 31 || 
|-id=622
| 12622 Doppelmayr || 6614 P-L || German mathematician, astronomer and cartographer Johann Gabriel Doppelmayr (1677–1750) worked in Nürnberg. His Atlas Coelestis, published in 1742, was one of the major celestial atlases of the eighteenth century || 
|-id=623
| 12623 Tawaddud || 9544 P-L || A fictional character from the Arabian or 1001 Nights, Tawaddud was a talented slave-girl from Baghdad whose knowledge of astronomy, medicine and theology was superior to that of the best scholars in the court of Caliph Harun al-Rashid (who ruled from 786 to 809). The name was suggested by R. H. van Gent || 
|-id=624
| 12624 Mariacunitia || 9565 P-L || Maria Cunitia (c. 1604–1664), the daughter of a Polish physician, taught herself astronomy, mathematics, medicine and history. In 1650 she published the Urania Propitia, a collection of astronomical tables based on Kepler's Rudolphine Tables. The name was suggested by R. H. van Gent || 
|-id=625
| 12625 Koopman || 9578 P-L || Elizabetha Koopman (1647–1693), daughter of a Dutch merchant, was the second wife of Polish astronomer Johannes Hevelius. She assisted her husband with his astronomical observations, and after his death in 1687 she prepared his star atlas and catalogue for publication. The name was suggested by R. H. van Gent || 
|-id=626
| 12626 Timmerman || 1116 T-1 || Petronella Johanna de Timmerman (1724–1786), a Dutch poetess who was educated in astronomy and mathematics at the observatory of Jan de Munck in Middelburg. In 1769 she married the Utrecht astronomer Jan Frederik Hennert and assisted him in his work. The name was suggested by R. H. van Gent || 
|-id=627
| 12627 Maryedwards || 1230 T-1 || Mary Edwards (c. 1750–1815), of Ludlow, Shropshire, was a skillful mathematical and astronomical computer. From 1773 until her death she performed most of the astronomical computations necessary for the preparation of the Nautical Almanac. The name was suggested by R. H. van Gent || 
|-id=628
| 12628 Ackworthorr || 2120 T-1 || Mary Ackworth Orr (1867–1949), wife of the solar physicist and Kodaikanal Observatory director John Evershed, in 1913 published a detailed study of the numerous astronomical allusions in the works of the Italian poet Dante Alighieri. The name was suggested by R. H. van Gent || 
|-id=629
| 12629 Jandeboer || 2168 T-1 || Jan Allard de Boer (born 1943) has been secretary of the Royal Dutch amateur society for meteorology and astronomy (NVWS) since 1995. He has done much to initiate contact between amateurs and professionals. Name suggested by A. v. d. Brugge and H. van Woerden || 
|-id=630
| 12630 Verstappen || 3033 T-1 || René Verstappen (born 1948) has been comptroller of the Dutch center for dissemination of information on astronomy, space science and meteorology for 36 years. He has done much for Dutch amateur astronomers. Name suggested by A. v. d. Brugge and H. van Woerden || 
|-id=631
| 12631 Mariekebaan || 3051 T-1 || Marieke Baan (born 1961), a Dutch public information officer. In 2005 she became press officer of the Dutch Research School for Astronomy. As such, she promotes astronomy through press releases, media events, educational activities and other forms of public outreach. || 
|-id=632
| 12632 Mignonette || 3105 T-1 || Mignonette Saavedra (born 1931), Chilean psychologist, studied at Smith College and Yale. In her professional life she put emphasis on neuro-psychology. She retired from the chair of the Psychology department at the University of Chile, Santiago in 2007. || 
|-id=633
| 12633 Warmenhoven || 3119 T-1 || Adrie Warmenhoven (born 1961), Dutch astronomy popularizer and educator. He is director of the 18th-century mechanical Eise Eisinga Planetarium in Franeker, The Netherlands. || 
|-id=634
| 12634 LOFAR || 3178 T-1 || LOFAR (LOw-Frequency ARray), a novel radio telescope, proposed by Leiden astronomer George Miley and inaugurated in 2010. || 
|-id=635
| 12635 Hennylamers || 4220 T-1 || Henny Lamers (born 1941), a Dutch astrophysicist, studied the evolution and mass loss of the most massive stars. He also gave many dozens of popular astronomy lectures for a wide variety of audiences, including children. || 
|-id=636
| 12636 Padrielli || 4854 T-1 || Lucia Padrielli (1943–2003), an Italian radio-astronomer who was closely involved in the "northern cross" radio telescope and in VLBI observations. During her career sheparticipated actively in Italian research policy, and she was president of IAU Commission 40 (Radio Astronomy). || 
|-id=637
| 12637 Gustavleonhardt || 1053 T-2 || Gustav Leonhardt (1928–2012), Dutch harpsichord player and conductor. He was the founder of the Leonhardt Consort, dedicated to performing baroque music on period instruments. In 1971, together with N. Harnoncourt and his Concentus Musicus, Leonhardt initiated the first complete recording of Bach's Cantatas. || 
|-id=638
| 12638 Fransbrüggen || 1063 T-2 || Frans Brüggen (born 1934) is a Dutch recorder player and conductor. He was the founder of the Orchestra of the Eighteenth Century, which is dedicated to performing classical music as authentically as possible. In 2012 he was awarded the Edison Classical Music Award || 
|-id=639
| 12639 Tonkoopman || 1105 T-2 || Ton Koopman (born 1944) is a Dutch harpsichord player and conductor, specializing in Baroque music. He founded the Amsterdam Baroque Orchestra in 1979, and the Amsterdam Baroque Choir in 1993. With these ensembles, he has given renowned performances of Bach's St. Matthew's Passion || 
|-id=640
| 12640 Reinbertdeleeuw || 1231 T-2 || Reinbert de Leeuw (born 1938), a Dutch conductor, pianist and composer, is devoted to performing and recording classical music composed after 1900, preferably in the presence of the composer. In 1974 he founded the Schoenberg Ensemble. || 
|-id=641
| 12641 Hubertushenrichs || 1310 T-2 || Hubertus Frederik Henrichs (born 1949), a Dutch astronomer. || 
|-id=642
| 12642 Davidjansen || 1348 T-2 || David Jona Jansen (born 1968), a Dutch astronomer in Leiden. || 
|-id=643
| 12643 Henkolthof || 3180 T-2 || Henk Olthof (born 1944), a Dutch astronomer from Groningen. || 
|-id=644
| 12644 Robertwielinga || 3285 T-2 || Robert Wielinga (born 1962) is a Dutch physics teacher, active amateur astronomer and popularizer of astronomy. He has been head of the public observatory Sonnenborgh in Utrecht, a member of the European Association for Astronomy Education (EAAE) and secretary of the EAAE Board. || 
|-id=645
| 12645 Jacobrosales || 4240 T-2 || Jacob Rosales (born 1967) of Jalisco, Mexico, and his son, Jacob (Coby) Rosales Chase (born 1996) by Daniel W. E. Green, a close family friend. Jacob senior is an expert musician and teacher, specializing in violin and other stringed instruments; Coby is a student at Case Western Reserve University. || 
|-id=646
| 12646 Avercamp || 5175 T-2 || Hendrick Avercamp (1585–1634), Dutch painter who specialized in painting the Netherlands in winter during the time that is now known as the Little Ice Age. Many of Avercamp's paintings feature people ice skating on frozen lakes. Name suggested by W. A. Fröger || 
|-id=647
| 12647 Pauluspotter || 5332 T-2 || Paulus Potter (1625–1654) was a Dutch Golden Age painter who painted mostly farm scenes and animals. His realistic paintings put the animals in the forefront so they contrasted against the background and give them a lively appearance. His most famous painting is The Young Bull (c. 1647). Name suggested by W. A. Fröger || 
|-id=648
| 12648 Ibarbourou || 1135 T-3 || Uruguayan poet and writer Juana Fernández Morales de Ibarbourou (1892–1979) was one of the most popular South American poets. Her poems are notable for her identification of her feelings with nature around her. || 
|-id=649
| 12649 Ascanios || 2035 T-3 || Ascanios, the son of Aeneas. He is also named Julus and became under this name the ancestor of the Julius family. || 
|-id=650
| 12650 de Vries || 2247 T-3 || Martien de Vries (born 1932) is a Dutch astronomer who was part of a small group who developed the first Dutch 1-m telescope on La Silla. His main area of focus was the development and adjustment of the photometer, which he himself used for infrared star measurements. || 
|-id=651
| 12651 Frenkel || 2268 T-3 || Daan Frenkel (born 1948) is a leading Dutch scientist who has contributed to the development of Monte Carlo and Molecular Dynamics simulation methods that led to a greater understanding of the phase behavior of molecular systems. He shed light on the state of carbon in stars and has launched the careers of many young researchers. || 
|-id=652
| 12652 Groningen || 2622 T-3 || Groningen is a city in north-east Netherlands. It is home to the Kapteyn Astronomical Institute of the University of Groningen. || 
|-id=653
| 12653 van der Klis || 2664 T-3 || Michiel van der Klis (born 1953) is a Dutch astronomer and expert on the properties of neutron stars and black holes. He discovered quasi-periodic oscillations in X-ray binaries. He is the former Director of the Anton Pannekoek Institute in Amsterdam, and the winner of the Bruno Rossi prize (1987) and the Spinoza award (2004). || 
|-id=654
| 12654 Heinofalcke || 4118 T-3 || Heino Falcke (born 1966) is a German radio astronomer working in Nijmegen (Netherlands), known for his innovative use of radio telescopes and his work on the Galactic Centre black hole. He received the Spinoza award in 2011. || 
|-id=655
| 12655 Benferinga || 5041 T-3 || Ben Feringa (born 1951) is a renowned Dutch chemist, who won the 2016 Nobel Prize in Chemistry for the development of molecular machines. He is a passionate lecturer and public advocate for science. || 
|-id=656
| 12656 Gerdebruijn || 5170 T-3 || Ger de Bruijn (1948–2017) was a renowned Dutch radio astronomer who worked at Dwingeloo and Groningen. His expertise was key to the scientific and technical success of both the Westerbork Synthesis Radio Telescope and LOFAR. || 
|-id=657
| 12657 Bonch-Bruevich ||  || Aleksej Mikhajlovich Bonch-Bruevich (born 1916), a corresponding member of the Russian Academy of Sciences. || 
|-id=658
| 12658 Peiraios || 1973 SL || Peiraios, son of Klytios, was a friend of Telemachos. || 
|-id=659
| 12659 Schlegel ||  || The brothers August Wilhelm (1767–1845) and Friedrich (1772–1829) Schlegel, both famous writers, philologists and teachers at the University of Jena. || 
|-id=661
| 12661 Schelling ||  || Friedrich Wilhelm Joseph von Schelling (1775–1854), professor of philosophy in University of Jena. || 
|-id=663
| 12663 Björkegren ||  || the family Björkegren, friends and neighbours of the discoverer's summer house on Gotland || 
|-id=664
| 12664 Sonisenia ||  || Sonya (Sofiya) and Senya (Semen) are charming and talented children of Mark Ziselevich Orlovskij, Kiev journalist, executive in the publishing trade and friend of the discoverer. || 
|-id=665
| 12665 Chriscarson ||  || Christopher A. Carson (born 1968) is the "Observatory (Spacecraft) Manager" of the Lucy mission. || 
|-id=668
| 12668 Scottstarin ||  || Scott Robin Starin (born 1975) is the "Guidance, Navigation, and Control Systems Engineer" of the Lucy mission. || 
|-id=669
| 12669 Emilybrisnehan ||  || Emily Walters Brisnehan (born 1987) is the "Instrument Accommodations Systems Engineer" of the Lucy mission. || 
|-id=670
| 12670 Passargea ||  || Michael Paul Oskar Passarge (born 1950), a prominent German amateur astronomer. || 
|-id=671
| 12671 Thörnqvist || 1980 FU || Owe Thörnqvist (born 1929), a singer-songwriter who has written a large number of songs, many about life in Uppsala, where he was born. || 
|-id=672
| 12672 Nygårdh ||  || Hans Cristian Nygårdh (born 1950) is one of the most prolific compilers of cross-words in Sweden. || 
|-id=673
| 12673 Kiselman ||  || Dan Kiselman (born 1963), a solar physicist, who was for many years the secretary of the Swedish Astronomical Society. || 
|-id=674
| 12674 Rybalka ||  || Anatolij Nikolaevich Rybalka (born 1939), an obstetrician and gynaecologist, professor at the Crimean Medical University. || 
|-id=675
| 12675 Chabot ||  || Anthony Chabot (1813–1888), one of the pioneering hydraulic engineers of the late nineteenth century and a developer of municipal water facilities. || 
|-id=676
| 12676 Dianemerline ||  || Diane Elizabeth Miller Merline (born 1959) iss an administrative coordinator for the Lucy mission. || 
|-id=677
| 12677 Gritsavage ||  || Anthony Thomas Gritsavage (born 1974) is the "Lead Quality Engineer" of the Lucy mission. || 
|-id=678
| 12678 Gerhardus ||  || Joerg Gerhardus (born 1968) is the "Payload Safety and Mission Assurance Manager" of the Lucy mission. || 
|-id=679
| 12679 Jamessimpson ||  || James Edward Simpson (born 1970) is the "L'Ralph Instrument Project Manager" of the Lucy mission. || 
|-id=680
| 12680 Bogdanovich ||  || Carrie C. L. Bogdanovich, American amateur astronomer who assisted in organizing the photographic glass plate archive of the 1.2-m Schmidt Oschin Telescope at Palomar Observatory || 
|-id=681
| 12681 Pevear ||  || Kristina Pevear (born 1982) is the "Systems Engineering Verification Engineer" of the Lucy mission. || 
|-id=682
| 12682 Kawada ||  || Kawada Oukou (1830–1896), a Japanese classical scholar born in Tamashima, Okayama prefecture. || 
|-id=686
| 12686 Bezuglyj ||  || Michail Yur'evich Bezuglyj (born 1963), a Ukrainian surgeon. || 
|-id=687
| 12687 de Valory ||  || Guy Louis Henri, Marquis de Valory (1692–1774), was a French aristocrat, well known from his friendship with Voltaire. He became an ambassador for the Prussian King Frederic II. || 
|-id=688
| 12688 Baekeland ||  || Leo Baekeland, Belgian-American chemist † || 
|-id=690
| 12690 Kochimiraikagaku ||  || Kochi-Mirai-Kagakukan (Kochi city future science museum) is to be built in the heart of the city and will open in 2017. It will be equipped with a planetarium and is expected to play a role for astronomy education for children || 
|-id=694
| 12694 Schleiermacher ||  || Friedrich Daniel Ernst Schleiermacher (1768–1834), German philosopher and Protestant theologian. He worked in Halle and Berlin. He contributed to theology, ethics, science, hermeneutics and aesthetics. His main philosophical work is the Dialektik (1839), but he is also known for his translations of Plato. || 
|-id=695
| 12695 Utrecht ||  || Utrechtis a city in the Netherlands renowned for its university and the Sonnenborgh Observatory. In 1945, the famous Flemish astronomer Marcel Minnaert introduced the discipline of solar spectroscopy there. In 2004 the city celebrates its 750th anniversary. || 
|-id=696
| 12696 Camus ||  || Albert Camus, French novelist and essayist, known for his novels L'Etranger and La Peste. Camus won the 1957 Nobel prize for literature. He defended truth, moderation and justice, adhering to liberal humanism and rejecting the dogmatic aspects of both Christianity and Marxism. || 
|-id=697
| 12697 Verhaeren ||  || Émile Verhaeren, the Belgian poet. Although writing exclusively in French, she took much inspiration from "Flanders Fields", glorifying the greatness of its painters and enjoying the pleasures of its common people. Other important themes in his work are human progress, brotherhood of man and his love for his wife. || 
|}

12701–12800 

|-
| 12701 Chénier || 1990 GE || André Chénier (1762–1794), was a French poet who died on the scaffold. The son of a Greek mother and an atheist father, he was inspired by Lucretius' De rerum natura, Holbach's Système de la Nature and d´Alembert's Rêve to write his naturalistic poem Hermès. || 
|-id=702
| 12702 Panamarenko ||  || Panamarenko (Henri Van Herwegen, born 1940) is a famous Belgian artist, well known for the construction of bizarre flying machines, the main theme for his work, in remembrance of the myth of Icarus. It remains a mystery whether his creations can actually fly. || 
|-id=704
| 12704 Tupolev ||  || Andrey Nikolaevich Tupolev (1888–1972) is known worldwide as an airplane designer. More than 100 types of airplanes were created under his guidance, including the first passenger jet aircraft Tu–104. Among the many notable accomplishments of his airplanes was the flight from Moscow over the North Pole to the US in 1937. || 
|-id=706
| 12706 Tanezaki ||  || Tanezaki is a beach on the eastern side of Urado Bay in Kōchi Prefecture. It is a beautiful parkland dotted with pine trees and a great place for swimming and relaxation for Kochi city residents. || 
|-id=708
| 12708 Van Straten ||  || Henri Van Straten (1892–1944) is considered one of the greatest lithographers that Belgium ever produced. His work includes more than 900 prints, using several materials and exposing different themes. || 
|-id=709
| 12709 Bergen op Zoom ||  || The Dutch city of Berg op Zoom. The medieval city in the southern part of The Netherlands was a fortress held by the Geuzen during the Eighty Years' War. Unsuccessfully besieged by Farnese in 1587 and by Spinola in 1622, this famous rebellion is archived in the beautiful hymn Merck toch hoe sterck. || 
|-id=710
| 12710 Breda ||  || Breda, a city dating from 1252 in the southern part of The Netherlands, was captured in 1581 by the Spaniards during the Eighty Years' War. In 1590 the town fell again into the hands of Maurice of Nassau, using a handful of men hidden under the turf of a peat-boat. || 
|-id=711
| 12711 Tukmit || 1991 BB || Tukmit from Native American mythology. He is the Father Sky, and with Tomaiyavit, bore the First People in the creation story of the Luiseño people, a tribe in San Diego County, California. || 
|-id=714
| 12714 Alkimos ||  || Alcimus, mythological son of Ares, who was, together with Automedon, in charge of Achilles' horses during the Trojan War || 
|-id=715
| 12715 Godin ||  || Louis Godin (1704–1760), French astronomer who proposed to send expeditions to the equator and the polar sea to measure in both places an arc of one degree in order to find out the true shape of the Earth; in 1753 he joined La Condamine and Bouguer on an expedition to Peru to do this very thing || 
|-id=716
| 12716 Delft ||  || Delft, Netherlands. The city dating from 1246 is famous for its blue pottery, its typical Dutch canal system and its highly esteemed University of Technology. || 
|-id=718
| 12718 Le Gentil ||  || Guillaume Le Gentil (1725–1792) was a French astronomer who discovered several deep-sky objects. He traveled to India to observe the transits of Venus in 1761 and 1769. After his return to France in 1771, he published the Voyage dans les Mers de l´Inde, which contains a wealth of data on natural sciences. || 
|-id=719
| 12719 Pingré ||  || Alexandre Guy Pingré (1711–1796), a French astronomer, was sent by the king to the isle of Rodrigue in the Indian Ocean to observe the transit of Venus in 1761. Pingré is particularly known from his two-volume Traité historique et théorique des comètes (1783–1784). || 
|-id=722
| 12722 Petrarca ||  || Francesco Petrarca (1304–1374), an Italian poet famous for his Sonnets (1327–1374), which were dedicated to his muse, Laura. He was born in Arezzo and died in the Euganean Hills. Petrarca may be regarded as one of the greatest scholars of his age. His critical spirit made him the founder of Renaissance humanism. || 
|-id=727
| 12727 Cavendish ||  || Henry Cavendish (1731–1810) was a British eccentric and a physicist. In 1798 he successfully determined the universal constant of gravitation using an apparatus with two small lead spheres, attached on a fiber, and two large lead spheres, by measuring the angular deflection of the fiber. || 
|-id=729
| 12729 Berger ||  || Hans Berger (1873–1941) was a German medical doctor and professor of neurology and psychiatry in Jena. He invented the electroencephalograph, placing electrical recording equipment on the surface of the skull. || 
|-id=734
| 12734 Haruna ||  || Haruna Takahashi (born 1994), the eldest daughter of Japanese co-discoverer Atsushi Takahashi || 
|-id=738
| 12738 Satoshimiki || 1992 AL || Satoshi Hayakawa (born 1992) and Miki Hayakawa (born 1995) are children of the second discoverer and partners in his observations. || 
|-id=742
| 12742 Delisle ||  || Joseph-Nicolas Delisle (1688–1768), was a French astronomer who went to Russia, where he founded the observatory of St. Petersburg. His brother, Guillaume Delisle (1675–1726), reformed French cartography by introducing a method for fixing positions by astronomical observation. || 
|-id=746
| 12746 Yumeginga ||  || The name Yumeginga is derived from the nickname of the Space and Science Museum in Takeo, Saga prefecture. "Yume" means "dream", and "ginga" means "galaxy". Yumeginga will be celebrating its tenth anniversary in July 2009 || 
|-id=747
| 12747 Michageffert ||  || Michael Geffert (born 1953) is a German astrometrist at Bonn University working on the precession of stars in globular clusters. He has done valuable work on the Hipparcos input catalog. He is also a discoverer of minor planets. Src || 
|-id=749
| 12749 Odokaigan || 1993 CB || Odokaigan is a beach on the Otsuki Peninsula at the south-western tip of Shikoku, Japan. || 
|-id=750
| 12750 Berthollet ||  || Claude-Louis Berthollet (1748–1822), a French chemist who analyzed ammonia and prussic acid. However, his greatest contributions to chemistry were his studies on chemical affinity and his discovery of the reversibility of reactions (Essai de statique chimique, 1830). || 
|-id=751
| 12751 Kamihayashi || 1993 EU || Kamihayashi, Niigata prefecture, Japan. From its mountains to its coastline, Kamihayashi features an abundance of natural topography. || 
|-id=752
| 12752 Kvarnis ||  || Kvarnis is the nickname of a school in Uppsala's Kvarngärdet district which hosts a scale model of the Saturnian moon Enceladus, as part of Sweden's Solar System || 
|-id=753
| 12753 Povenmire || 1993 HE || Katie Povenmire, an observer of meteor showers, lunar grazes and minor-planet occultations for determining a body's diameter together with her husband Hal Povenmire. By profession, Katie is a coronary critical care nurse (Src) || 
|-id=755
| 12755 Balmer ||  || Johann J. Balmer (1825–1898), a Swiss mathematician and high-school teacher who examined the four visible lines in the spectrum of the hydrogen atom. By playing around with the numbers of their wavelengths, he finally put all four wavelengths into one equation, i.e., Balmer's formula. || 
|-id=757
| 12757 Yangtze ||  || Yangtze River in China. It is the third longest river in the world. With its source at the base of several glaciers in the eastern part of the Qinghai-Tibet Plateau, the river has great importance for understanding the cultural origins of South China. Humans have lived in the region for at least 27000 years. || 
|-id=758
| 12758 Kabudari ||  || Kabudari ("big tree" in Arawak), a native name from Palavecino, Lara, Venezuela || 
|-id=759
| 12759 Joule ||  || James Joule (1818–1889), an English physicist who attempted to demonstrate the unity of forces in nature. In 1840 he determined the mechanical equivalent of heat and showed that heat is produced by motion. || 
|-id=760
| 12760 Maxwell ||  || James Clerk Maxwell (1831–1879), was a Scottish mathematician and physicist, working in the discipline of electromagnetism. In A treatise on Electricity and Magnetism (1873), the Maxwell equations appear for the first time. He suggested that the rings of Saturn are composed of small individual particles. || 
|-id=761
| 12761 Pauwels ||  || Thierry Pauwels (born 1957/58), Belgian astronomer, astrometrist, and a discoverer of minor planets at the Uccle Observatory || 
|-id=762
| 12762 Nadiavittor ||  || Nadia Vittor (1949–1989), aunt of astronomer Alberto Toso, one of the uncredited discoverers of the staff at Farra d'Isonzo Observatory || 
|-id=766
| 12766 Paschen ||  || Louis Paschen (1865–1947), a German physicist and an outstanding spectroscopist || 
|-id=769
| 12769 Kandakurenai || 1994 FF || Kurenai Kanda (born 1952), Japanese actress and professional storyteller, member of the executive board of the Japan Space Forum. || 
|-id=771
| 12771 Kimshin ||  || Kim Shin (born 1955), Japanese musician and synthesizer performer, whose compact disc Everlasting Space traveled into space with the shuttle Discovery in 2000 || 
|-id=773
| 12773 Lyman ||  || Theodore Lyman (1874–1954), an American physicist who discovered, in 1906, a group of lines in the spectrum of the hydrogen atom that now bears his name. In 1970, a lunar crater was named after him by the IAU. || 
|-id=774
| 12774 Pfund ||  || August Hermann Pfund (1879–1949), an American physicist and professor of optics at Baltimore University. He predicted correctly the very far infrared spectrum of the hydrogen atom (the Pfund series). || 
|-id=775
| 12775 Brackett ||  || Frederick Sumner Brackett (1896–1988), an American physicist who predicted the far-infrared lines of the hydrogen spectrum || 
|-id=776
| 12776 Reynolds ||  || Osbourne Reynolds (1842–1912), was a British engineer and physicist known for his work in fluid dynamics. He is remembered for the Reynolds' number (1883), which is defined by the difference between laminar and turbulent flow. He wrote a remarkable book: The Sub-mechanics of the Universe (1903). || 
|-id=777
| 12777 Manuel ||  || Manuel Antolini (1959–2002), the son of the first discoverer, Plinio Antolini. || 
|-id=780
| 12780 Salamony ||  || Sandra Noel Salamony (born 1962), American creative director for Sky Publishing (Sky & Telescope, Night Sky, Beautiful Universe) || 
|-id=782
| 12782 Mauersberger ||  || Brothers Rudolf (1889–1971) and Erhard (1903–1982) Mauersberger were renowned German musicians and choirmasters. || 
|-id=787
| 12787 Abetadashi ||  || Tadashi Abe (born 1943), a Japanese amateur astronomer who published a number of scientific papers and a thesis based on his discoveries. || 
|-id=788
| 12788 Shigeno ||  || Toramatsu Shigeno (1898–1986), Japanese amateur astronomer, and father-in-law of the discoverer, Tomimaru Okuni || 
|-id=789
| 12789 Salvadoraguirre || 1995 TX || Salvador Aguirre (born 1952) is an avid amateur astronomer from Hermosillo, Mexico. He has conducted many observations of variable stars, asteroid occultations, meteors and comets. He has also helped popularize and coordinate amateur astronomical research within Mexico || 
|-id=790
| 12790 Cernan ||  || Gene Cernan (1934–2017), American astronaut and commander of the Apollo 17 mission. He was the 11th person to walk on the Moon. || 
|-id=793
| 12793 Hosinokokai ||  || Hoshinokokai is a star-loving group that has been working voluntarily for 20 years at the astronomical observatory on Tawara Junior High School in Utsunomiya City, Tochigi Prefecture. || 
|-id=796
| 12796 Kamenrider || 1995 WF || Kamen Rider, a Japanese TV character, played by Hiroshi Fujioka, is a cyborg and a lover of justice. Ninety-eight stories of Kamen Rider were broadcast from 1971 to 1973. His fighting action and heroic stories fascinated all boys in Japan, including the discoverer. || 
|-id=799
| 12799 von Suttner ||  || Bertha von Suttner (1843–1914), Austrian novelist and one of the first notable woman pacifists. She is credited with influencing Alfred Nobel in the establishment of the Nobel Prize for Peace, of which she was the recipient in 1905. || 
|-id=800
| 12800 Oobayashiarata ||  || Arata Oobayashi (1957–1999), a Japanese amateur astronomer and computer engineer. He was also famous as a photographic artist, leaving excellent astronomical photographs. The name was suggested by M. Namiki. || 
|}

12801–12900 

|-
| 12801 Somekawa || 1995 XD || Somekawa Shuichi (1962–1997), a Japanese amateur astronomer and optical engineer || 
|-id=802
| 12802 Hagino ||  || Hagino Akira (1949–1999), Japanese amateur astronomer who died in an accident while observing. He worked as an instructor of popular astronomy at a small astronomical facility in Yamanashi prefecture and inspired many children and visitors with interests in the wonderful night sky. || 
|-id=810
| 12810 Okumiomote || 1996 BV || Okumiomote (奥三面), a Japanese archaeological site in northern Niigata prefecture, which was submerged by the damming of a river in 2000 || 
|-id=811
| 12811 Rigonistern ||  || Mario Rigoni Stern (1921–2008), was an Italian writer, who was born and lived in Asiago. He is known for his poetry and novels about mountain life and habitat. Stern's work has been translated into more than a dozen languages and has won several national and international awards. || 
|-id=812
| 12812 Cioni ||  || Giovanni Cioni (1943–2002) was an amateur astronomer of the Montelupo Group || 
|-id=813
| 12813 Paolapaolini ||  || Paola Paolini (1947–2002) was the wife of Mauro Gherardini, amateur astronomer of the Montelupo Group || 
|-id=814
| 12814 Vittorio ||  || Vittorio Beltrami (1926–2012) continuously promoted, supported and encouraged scientific and technological initiatives, in particular at the Belgirate Asteroids-Comets-Meteors Congress in 1993, and also during international events involving space and astronomy, with special attention to minor bodies of the solar system || 
|-id=817
| 12817 Federica ||  || Federica Mula (born 1995) is the talented daughter of Manuela Sciascia and Nuccio Mula. In the opera Empedocle from Mula-Portera (Agrigento, 2002), she performed the role of the girl who found and returned the sandal of Greek philosopher Empedocles near the Etna volcano || 
|-id=818
| 12818 Tomhanks ||  || Tom Hanks (born 1956), American actor who starred in such films as Splash, Sleepless in Seattle, Apollo 13 and Saving Private Ryan, winning Oscars for his roles in Philadelphia and Forrest Gump. He was executive producer for the miniseries From the Earth to the Moon, which dramatized the Apollo expeditions to the moon. || 
|-id=819
| 12819 Susumutakahasi || 1996 JO || Susumu Takahasi (born 1958), director of the Dynic Astronomical Observatory "Tenkyukan", is ardent about astronomical education and a fine observer of variable stars || 
|-id=820
| 12820 Robinwilliams ||  || Robin Williams (1951–2014), was an actor and a comedian whose television series Mork and Mindy launched his successful career in improvisational comedy and film. He starred in Good Morning Vietnam and Mrs. Doubtfire, as well as in Good Will Hunting, for which he won an Academy Award. || 
|-id=823
| 12823 Pochintesta || 1997 AP || Alberto E.C. Pochintesta (1909–1984) was an Uruguayan astronomer and school teacher who worked at the Observatorio de Montevideo . || 
|-id=828
| 12828 Batteas ||  || Frank Batteas (born 1955) is a pilot for the F/A–18 and C–17 flight research projects at NASA's Dryden Flight Research Center, Edwards, California. He has accumulated more than 4700 hours of flight experience in more than 40 different types of aircraft || 
|-id=833
| 12833 Kamenný Újezd ||  || The Czech village of Kamenný Újezd || 
|-id=834
| 12834 Bomben ||  || Craig R. Bomben (born 1962) is a pilot in the Flight Crew Branch of NASA's Dryden Flight Research Center, Edwards, California. He has more than 17 years and 3800 hours of flight experience in over 50 different aircraft types || 
|-id=835
| 12835 Stropek ||  || Václav Stropek (born 1938) has been a long-time technician at the Klet Observatory. || 
|-id=838
| 12838 Adamsmith ||  || Adam Smith, 18th-century key figure of the Scottish Enlightenment, author of An Enquiry into the Nature and Causes of the Wealth of Nations || 
|-id=840
| 12840 Paolaferrari ||  || Paola Ferrari, Librarian of the town of San Marcello Pistoiese in Italy and contributor to the Pian dei Termini Observatory || 
|-id=843
| 12843 Ewers ||  || Richard G. Ewers (born 1946) is a pilot in the Flight Crew Branch of NASA's Dryden Flight Research Center, Edwards, California. He has more than 32 years and nearly 9000 hours of flight experience in all types of aircraft. || 
|-id=845
| 12845 Crick ||  || Francis Crick (1916–2004) was a British scientist who proposed, together with J. D. Watson, the double-helical structure for DNA in 1953. Subsequently, a general theory for the structure of small viruses was worked out. He has also investigated the nature of consciousness in The astonishing hypothesis (1994). || 
|-id=846
| 12846 Fullerton || 1997 MR || C. Gordon Fullerton (born 1936) is a research pilot at NASA's Dryden Flight Research Center, Edwards, California. With over 15~000 hours of flying time, he has piloted 135 different types of aircraft. He has logged 382 hours in space as a NASA astronaut, during two Space Shuttle missions || 
|-id=848
| 12848 Agostino ||  || Agostino Boattini (born 1932) is the father of the discoverer || 
|-id=850
| 12850 Axelmunthe ||  || Axel Munthe (1857–1949), a descendant of a Flemish family that settled in Sweden during the sixteenth century, was a physician and writer who had studied neurology under Charcot. In his autobiographical The story of San Michele (1929), he portrayed the foibles of the rich and the poor in a tragicomic fashion || 
|-id=852
| 12852 Teply ||  || Grant Teply, an American ISEF awardee in 2002 †  || 
|-id=855
| 12855 Tewksbury ||  || Carolyn Morgan Tewksbury, an ISEF awardee in 2002 || 
|-id=859
| 12859 Marlamoore ||  || Marla H. Moore (born 1940), a staff member at NASA's Goddard Space Flight Center, is known worldwide for her studies of the irradiation of ices and the implications of the irradiation processes for interstellar grains, comets, and icy satellites. The name was suggested by M. F. A'Hearn. || 
|-id=860
| 12860 Turney ||  || Shannon Quinn Turney, an ISEF awardee in 2002 || 
|-id=861
| 12861 Wacker ||  || David "Buzz" Wacker, an ISEF awardee in 2002 || 
|-id=863
| 12863 Whitfield ||  || Meghan Elizabeth Whitfield (born 1985), an ISEF awardee in 2002 || 
|-id=866
| 12866 Yanamadala ||  || Vijay Yanamadala, an ISEF awardee in 2002 || 
|-id=867
| 12867 Joëloïc ||  || Joël (born 1982) and Loïc (born 1985) are the children of Gérard Faure, accountant, amateur astronomer and active Magnitude Alert Project observer of minor planets. Both sons are now students at the University of Grenoble, in the disciplines of economy and computer science || 
|-id=868
| 12868 Onken ||  || Christopher S. Onken (born 1979) was a summer student at the Lowell Observatory in 1998. As an observer, he made the first LONEOS near-earth-asteroid discovery and suggested many useful improvements to the observing protocol || 
|-id=870
| 12870 Rolandmeier ||  || Roland C. Meier (born 1964), of Gretag Imaging, Zurich, is well known for his research on the chemistry of comets, ranging from studies of the chemistry observed in situ at 1P/Halley with Giotto to numerous optical and radio studies using ground-based telescopes. The name was suggested by M. F. A'Hearn || 
|-id=871
| 12871 Samarasinha ||  || Nalin Samarasinha (born 1958), a Sri Lanka planetary scientist and discoverer of minor planets of the National Optical Astronomy Observatories, Tucson, has carried out many studies of the dynamical evolution of cometary nuclei and the related dynamical processes of dust in cometary comae. This includes his demonstration of the excited rotational state of 1P/Halley. || 
|-id=872
| 12872 Susiestevens ||  || Susie Stevens, American teacher, 2002 winner of an Intel Foundation Excellence in Teaching Award || 
|-id=873
| 12873 Clausewitz ||  || Carl von Clausewitz (1780–1831) was a Prussian general and intellectual who gained extensive combat experience by fighting against the armies of the French Revolution and Napoleon. His famous book Vom Kriege ("On War") is considered one of the most influential works of military philosophy in the Western world. || 
|-id=874
| 12874 Poisson || 1998 QZ || Siméon Denis Poisson (1781–1840) was a prolific French mathematician and inspiring teacher who left his mark on many branches of applied mathematics, including electricity and magnetism, celestial mechanics and elasticity. His name is also associated with the Poisson distribution in probability theory. || 
|-id=878
| 12878 Erneschiller ||  || Ernest Schiller, American teacher, 2002 winner of an Intel Foundation Excellence in Teaching Award || 
|-id=880
| 12880 Juliegrady ||  || Julie Grady, American teacher, 2002 winner of an Intel Foundation Excellence in Teaching Award || 
|-id=881
| 12881 Yepeiyu ||  || Ye Peiyu, Chinese teacher, 2002 winner of an Intel Foundation Excellence in Teaching Award || 
|-id=893
| 12893 Mommert ||  || Michael Mommert (born 1982) has analysed Herschel and Spitzer space telescope observations of transneptunian and near-Earth objects, finding further evidence for links between these populations. He has provided insight into the physical properties of the Plutinos and the cometary component of the NEO population. || 
|-id=895
| 12895 Balbastre ||  || Claude-Bénigme Balbastre (1729–1799) was a French composer who, after writing more-or-less academic organ work at Dijon, blossomed as a fashionable Parisian harpsichord teacher and cosmopolite. La Lugeac and La d´Héricourt rank among the very finest keyboard works of the 1750s || 
|-id=896
| 12896 Geoffroy ||  || Étienne Geoffroy Saint-Hilaire (1772–1844), French naturalist who established in Philosophie anat-omique (2 volumes, 1818–1822) the principle of unity of organic composition among vertebrates (and later also invertebrates). Opposing Cuvier, Geoffroy's concepts created a receptive scientific audience for Darwin's evolution theory. || 
|-id=897
| 12897 Bougeret ||  || Jean-Louis Bougeret (born 1945) is Director of the Laboratoire d´Etudes Spatiales et d´Instrumentation en Astrophysique at Paris Observatory. He is an expert in the solar wind and interplanetary medium, and is active in space research. The name was suggested by M. A. Barucci. || 
|-id=898
| 12898 Mignard ||  || François Mignard (born 1949) is a French astronomer, former director of CERGA who has been involved with ESA's Hipparcos and Gaia missions. || 
|-id=900
| 12900 Rishabjain ||  || Rishab Jain (born 2004) is an American youth inventor, who was an International Science and Engineering Fair and Broadcom MASTERS awardee. || 
|}

12901–13000 

|-id=908
| 12908 Yagudina ||  || Eleonora Ivanovna Yagudina (born 1941) is a staff member at the Institute of Applied Astronomy of the Russian Academy of Sciences. She has worked extensively on the motions of solar system bodies, and devotes much of her time to educating young people in astronomy || 
|-id=909
| 12909 Jaclifford ||  || Jack Clifford (born 1933), of Scottsdale, Arizona, is a pioneering cable television entrepreneur, avid amateur astronomer and a major contributor to numerous science and educational institutions. He has been of great service on the Lowell Trustee's Advisory Board, particularly in fund raising || 
|-id=910
| 12910 Deliso ||  || Joseph John Deliso (1906–1994), contractor, manufacturer, public servant and philanthropist, served many years as Chairman of the Trustees of Springfield Technical Community College, Massachusetts, and was a major endower of that institution. The name was suggested by W. L. Putnam || 
|-id=911
| 12911 Goodhue ||  || Samuel Harlowe Goodhue (born 1921), engineer and alpinist of Jackson, New Hampshire, was Chairman of the Trails Committee and then the Huts Committee for the Appalachian Mountain Club. He has been generous with his time and talents to both the Mount Washington (meteorological) and Lowell observatories || 
|-id=912
| 12912 Streator ||  || The US city of Streator, home town of Clyde W. Tombaugh (1906–1997), who discovered of Pluto || 
|-id=916
| 12916 Eteoneus ||  || Eteoneus, son of Boethous and King Menelaus of Sparta's weapon-carrier during the Trojan War, who helped Odysseus in his attempts to return home || 
|-id=919
| 12919 Tomjohnson ||  || Thomas J. Johnson (born 1923) developed a technique for creating Schmidt telescope correctors that allowed the mass production of Schmidt-Cassegrain telescopes. In 1978 the Optical Society of America awarded him the David Richardson Medal for this work || 
|-id=923
| 12923 Zephyr ||  || The word zephyr derives from the name of the ancient Greek god of the west wind, Zephyros. The name was suggested by M. Smitherman || 
|-id=926
| 12926 Brianmason ||  || Brian Harold Mason (1917–2009), New Zealand-born meteoriticist and lunar geologist || 
|-id=927
| 12927 Pinocchio ||  || Pinocchio, character from Carlo Collodi's eponymous tale || 
|-id=928
| 12928 Nicolapozio ||  || Nicola Pozio (born 1965), accountant for the Spaceguard Foundation || 
|-id=929
| 12929 Periboea ||  || Periboea was the grandmother of the Trojan ally Asteropaios and mother of Pelegon who she conceived by way of the river god Axius. || 
|-id=931
| 12931 Mario ||  || Mario Sposetti (1916–1959), father of Swiss discoverer Stefano Sposetti || 
|-id=932
| 12932 Conedera ||  || Marina Conedera (born 1962), wife of Swiss discoverer Stefano Sposetti || 
|-id=933
| 12933 Muzzonigro ||  || Livio Muzzonigro (born 1932) an Italian teacher of mathematics and physics at Duca degli in Gorizia, who was a teacher of one of the discoverers of this minor planet at the Farra d'Isonzo Observatory. || 
|-id=934
| 12934 Bisque ||  || Stephen Bisque (born 1960), Thomas Bisque (born 1963), Daniel Bisque (born 1965) and Matthew Bisque(born 1966). Since 1984, they have been developing and distributing software and instrumentation for the astronomical community that completely automates telescope control and CCD image acquisition. || 
|-id=935
| 12935 Zhengzhemin ||  || Zheng Zhemin (born 1924), an academician of the Chinese Academy of Sciences and Engineering and a foreign academician of the U.S. National Academy of Engineering, is one of the founders of the field of explosion mechanics. A leader of the field of mechanics in China, he has proposed and created new branches of mechanics || 
|-id=937
| 12937 Premadi || 3024 P-L || Premana W. Premadi (born 1964) is an astronomer at the ITB Observatorium Bosscha (Indonesia), an authority on cosmology, and teacher of theoretical astrophysics. Since 2005, she has been a member of the Universe Awareness (UNAWE) International Team, and is the founder and chair of UNAWE Indonesia (2007–2013). || 
|-id=972
| 12972 Eumaios ||  || Eumaeus (Eumaios), Odysseus's swineherd in Greek mythology. When Odysseus returned to Ithaca, Eumaios helped him to conquer the suitors of Penelope. || 
|-id=973
| 12973 Melanthios ||  || Melanthius (Melanthios), Odysseus's goatherd in Greek mythology. He mocked Odysseus when the latter came to Eumaios disguised as a beggar. Later Odysseus killed him || 
|-id=974
| 12974 Halitherses ||  || Halitherses, an Ithacan prophet in Greek mythology. He went together with Telemachos to search for Odysseus. He was also a friend of Odysseus himself. || 
|-id=975
| 12975 Efremov ||  || Yurij Nikolaevich Efremov (born 1937), Russian astronomer and a leading research scientist at the Sternberg Astronomical Institute, Moscow University. His works on variable stars and star-formation regions are well known. He discovered the period-age relationship for Cepheids and created the concept of large complexes of young stars. || 
|-id=976
| 12976 Kalinenkov ||  || Nikifor Dmitrievich Kalinenkov (1924–1996) was professor of physics and astronomy at the Nikolaev State Pedagogical Institute in Ukraine. He was the first director of the Institute's astronomical observatory and contributed much to its instrumentation through "make-it-yourself" telescopes and other devices || 
|-id=978
| 12978 Ivashov ||  || Vladimir Ivashov (1939–1995), a Russian Soviet actor who created a striking image of a defender of the motherland in the film Ballad about a soldier produced by Grigorij Chukhraj || 
|-id=979
| 12979 Evgalvasilʹev ||  || Evgenij Aleksandrovich Vasilʹev, Ukrainian educator, creator of the Artek pioneer camp "Lesnoj" in Crimea || 
|-id=980
| 12980 Pruetz ||  || Todd Orville Pruetz (born 1968) is the "Science Communications Publisher" of the Lucy mission. || 
|-id=981
| 12981 Tracicase ||  || Traci Case (born 1976) was a member of the Step-1 proposal team of the Lucy mission, as well as its "Cost, Schedule and Earned Value Lead, and Deputy Payload Manager" at the Southwest Research Institute. || 
|-id=982
| 12982 Kaseybond ||  || Kasey J. Bond (born 1991) is a "Resource Analyst" of the Lucy mission. || 
|-id=983
| 12983 Mattcox ||  || Matthew Anthony Cox (born 1966) is one of the "Spacecraft Program Manager" for the Lucy mission, leading the development team at Lockheed Martin. || 
|-id=984
| 12984 Lowry ||  || Stephen C. Lowry (born 1976), Irish astronomer who performs precise observations of cometary nuclei to reveal their bulk properties. He also studies physical and chemical properties of near-earth objects. || 
|-id=985
| 12985 Mattgarrison ||  || Matthew Brian Garrison (born 1983) is the "L'Ralph Instrument Systems Engineer" of the Lucy mission. || 
|-id=986
| 12986 Kretke ||  || Katherine A. Kretke (born 1982) is an astrophysicist and the "communications and public engagement lead" of the Lucy mission. || 
|-id=987
| 12987 Racalmuto ||  || Racalmuto is a town in Sicily with Greek and Roman origins. The municipal astronomical observatory promotes astronomical research and dissemination. || 
|-id=988
| 12988 Tiffanykapler ||  || Tiffany L. Kapler (born 1977) is the "Public Outreach Specialist" of the Lucy mission. || 
|-id=989
| 12989 Chriseanderson ||  || Chris Elaine Anderson (born 1957) is a typesetter and administrative assistant for the Lucy mission, who participated in the spacecraft's "Step-1 proposal" and the "Phase-A Concept Study Report". || 
|-id=990
| 12990 Josetillard ||  || Jose P. Tillard (born 1976) is the "Risk Manager and Systems Engineer" of the Lucy mission. || 
|-id=991
| 12991 Davidgriffiths ||  || David J. Griffiths (born 1961) is the "Flight Project Mechanical Systems and Solar Arrays Systems Engineer" of the Lucy mission. || 
|-id=999
| 12999 Toruń ||  || The Polish city of Toruń, birthplace of astronomer Nicolas Copernicus (1473–1543), whose Old Town is a UNESCO World Heritage Site and whose university houses the largest observatory in Poland || 
|}

References 

012001-013000